This article is a list of electoral wards (i.e. those used for local elections) in each parliamentary constituency in England. For those in Wales, see List of electoral wards in Wales.

Administrative Areas

Greater London

Barking and Dagenham and Havering
Barking: Abbey, Alibon, Becontree, Eastbury, Gascoigne, Goresbrook, Longbridge, Mayesbrook, Parsloes, Thames, Valence.

Dagenham and Rainham: Chadwell Heath, Eastbrook, Elm Park, Heath, Rainham and Wennington, River, South Hornchurch, Village, Whalebone.

Hornchurch and Upminster: Cranham, Emerson Park, Gooshays, Hacton, Harold Wood, Heaton, St Andrew's, Upminster.

Romford: Brooklands, Havering Park, Hylands, Mawneys, Pettits, Romford Town, Squirrel's Heath.

Barnet
Chipping Barnet: Brunswick Park, Coppetts, East Barnet, High Barnet, Oakleigh, Totteridge, Underhill.

Finchley and Golders Green: Childs Hill, East Finchley, Finchley Church End, Garden Suburb, Golders Green, West Finchley, Woodhouse.

Hendon: Burnt Oak, Colindale, Edgware, Hale, Hendon, Mill Hill, West Hendon.

Bexley and Greenwich
Bexleyheath and Crayford: Barnehurst, Brampton, Christchurch, Colyers, Crayford, Danson Park, North End, St Michael's.

Eltham: Coldharbour and New Eltham, Eltham North, Eltham South, Eltham West, Kidbrooke with Hornfair, Middle Park and Sutcliffe, Shooters Hill.

Erith and Thamesmead: Abbey Wood, Belvedere, Erith, Lesnes Abbey, Northumberland Heath, Plumstead, Thamesmead East, Thamesmead Moorings.

Greenwich and Woolwich: Blackheath Westcombe, Charlton, Glyndon, Greenwich West, Peninsula, Woolwich Common, Woolwich Riverside.

Old Bexley and Sidcup: Blackfen and Lamorbey, Blendon and Penhill, Cray Meadows, East Wickham, Falconwood and Welling, Longlands, St Mary's, Sidcup.

Brent and London Borough of Camden
Brent Central: Dollis Hill, Dudden Hill, Harlesden, Kensal Green, Mapesbury, Stonebridge, Tokyngton, Welsh Harp, Willesden Green.

Brent North: Alperton, Barnhill, Fryent, Kenton, Northwick Park, Preston, Queensbury, Sudbury, Wembley Central.

Hampstead and Kilburn: Belsize, Brondesbury Park, Fortune Green, Frognal and Fitzjohns, Hampstead Town, Kilburn (Brent), Kilburn (Camden), Queens Park, Swiss Cottage, West Hampstead.

Holborn and St Pancras: Bloomsbury, Camden Town with Primrose Hill, Cantelowes, Gospel Oak, Haverstock, Highgate, Holborn and Covent Garden,
Kentish Town, King's Cross, Regent's Park, St Pancras and Somers Town.

Bromley and Lewisham
Beckenham: Bromley Common and Keston, Copers Cope, Hayes and Coney Hall, Kelsey and Eden Park, Shortlands, West Wickham.

Bromley and Chislehurst: Bickley, Bromley Town, Chislehurst, Cray Valley West, Mottingham and Chislehurst North, Plaistow and Sundridge.

Lewisham, Deptford: Brockley, Crofton Park, Evelyn, Ladywell, Lewisham Central, New Cross, Telegraph Hill.

Lewisham East: Blackheath, Catford South, Downham, Grove Park, Lee Green, Rushey Green, Whitefoot.

Lewisham West and Penge: Bellingham, Clock House, Crystal Palace, Penge and Cator, Forest Hill, Perry Vale, Sydenham.

Orpington: Biggin Hill, Chelsfield and Pratts Bottom, Cray Valley East, Darwin, Farnborough and Crofton, Orpington, Petts Wood and Knoll.

Croydon
Croydon Central: Addiscombe, Ashburton, Fairfield, Fieldway, Heathfield, New Addington, Shirley, Woodside.

Croydon North: Bensham Manor, Broad Green, Norbury, Selhurst, South Norwood, Thornton Heath, Upper Norwood, West Thornton.

Croydon South: Coulsdon East, Coulsdon West, Croham, Kenley, Purley, Sanderstead, Selsdon and Ballards, Waddon.

Ealing
Ealing Central and Acton: Acton Central, Ealing Broadway, Ealing Common, East Acton, Hanger Hill, South Acton, Southfield, Walpole.

Ealing North: Cleveland, Greenford Broadway, Greenford Green, Hobbayne, North Greenford, Northolt Mandeville, Northolt West End, Perivale.

Ealing, Southall: Dormers Wells, Elthorne, Lady Margaret, Northfield, Norwood Green, Southall Broadway, Southall Green.

Enfield
Edmonton: Bush Hill Park, Edmonton Green, Haselbury, Jubilee, Lower Edmonton, Ponders End, Upper Edmonton.

Enfield North: Chase, Enfield Highway, Enfield Lock, Highlands, Southbury, Town, Turkey Street.

Enfield, Southgate: Bowes, Cockfosters, Grange, Palmers Green, Southgate, Southgate Green, Winchmore Hill.

Hackney
Hackney North and Stoke Newington: Brownswood, Cazenove, Clissold, Dalston, Hackney Downs, Leabridge, Lordship, New River, Springfield, Stoke Newington Central.

Hackney South and Shoreditch: Chatham, De Beauvoir, Hackney Central, Haggerston, Hoxton, King's Park, Queensbridge, Victoria, Wick.

Hammersmith, Fulham and Kensington and Chelsea
Chelsea and Fulham: Chelsea Riverside, Fulham Broadway, Brompton & Hans Town, Munster, Palace Riverside, Parsons Green and Walham, Redcliffe, Royal Hospital, Sands End, Stanley, Town.

Hammersmith: Addison, Askew, Avonmore and Brook Green, College Park and Old Oak, Fulham Reach, Hammersmith Broadway, North End, Ravenscourt Park, Shepherd's Bush Green, Wormholt and White City.

Kensington: Abingdon, Campden, Colville, Courtfield, Dalgarno, Earl's Court, Golborne, Holland, Norland, Notting Dale, Pembridge, Queen's Gate, St Charles, St Helen's.

Haringey
Hornsey and Wood Green: Alexandra, Bounds Green, Crouch End, Fortis Green, Highgate, Hornsey, Muswell Hill, Noel Park, Stroud Green, Woodside.

Tottenham: Bruce Grove, Harringay, Northumberland Park, St Ann's, Seven Sisters, Tottenham Green, Tottenham Hale, West Green, White Hart Lane.

Harrow and Hillingdon
Harrow East: Belmont, Canons, Edgware, Harrow Weald, Kenton East, Kenton West, Queensbury, Stanmore Park, Wealdstone.

Harrow West: Greenhill, Harrow on the Hill, Headstone North, Headstone South, Marlborough, Rayners Lane, Roxbourne, Roxeth, West Harrow.

Hayes and Harlington: Barnhill, Botwell, Charville, Heathrow Villages, Pinkwell, Townfield, West Drayton, Yeading.

Ruislip, Northwood and Pinner: Eastcote and East Ruislip, Harefield, Hatch End, Ickenham, Northwood, Northwood Hills, Pinner, Pinner South, West Ruislip.

Uxbridge and South Ruislip: Brunel, Cavendish, Hillingdon East, Manor, South Ruislip, Uxbridge North, Uxbridge South, Yiewsley.

Hounslow
Brentford and Isleworth: Brentford, Chiswick Homefields, Chiswick Riverside, Hounslow Central, Hounslow Heath, Hounslow South, Isleworth, Osterley and Spring Grove, Syon, Turnham Green.

Feltham and Heston: Bedfont, Cranford, Feltham North, Feltham West, Hanworth, Hanworth Park, Heston Central, Heston East, Heston West, Hounslow West.

Islington
Islington North: Finsbury Park, Highbury East, Highbury West, Hillrise, Junction, Mildmay, St George's, Tollington.

Islington South and Finsbury: Barnsbury, Bunhill, Caledonian, Canonbury, Clerkenwell, Holloway, St Mary's, St Peter's.

Kingston upon Thames and Richmond upon Thames
Kingston and Surbiton: Alexandra, Berrylands, Beverley, Chessington North and Hook, Chessington South, Grove, Norbiton, Old Malden, St James, St Mark's, Surbiton Hill, Tolworth and Hook Rise.

Richmond Park: Barnes, Canbury, Coombe Hill, Coombe Vale, East Sheen, Ham, Petersham and Richmond Riverside, Kew, Mortlake and Barnes Common, North Richmond, South Richmond, Tudor.

Twickenham: Fulwell and Hampton Hill, Hampton, Hampton North, Hampton Wick, Heathfield, St Margarets and North Twickenham, South Twickenham, Teddington, Twickenham Riverside, West Twickenham, Whitton.

Lambeth and Southwark
Bermondsey and Old Southwark: Cathedrals, Chaucer, East Walworth, Grange, Newington, Riverside, Rotherhithe, South Bermondsey, Surrey Docks.

Camberwell and Peckham: Brunswick Park, Camberwell Green, Faraday, Livesey, Nunhead, Peckham, Peckham Rye, South Camberwell, The Lane.

Dulwich and West Norwood: Coldharbour, college, East Dulwich, Gipsy Hill, Herne Hill, Knight's Hill, Thurlow Park, Village.

Streatham: Brixton Hill, Clapham Common, St Leonard's, Streatham Hill, Streatham South, Streatham Wells, Thornton, Tulse Hill.

Vauxhall: Bishop's, Clapham Town, Ferndale, Larkhall, Oval, Prince's, Stockwell, Vassall.

Merton
Mitcham and Morden: Colliers Wood, Cricket Green, Figge's Marsh, Graveney, Lavender Fields, Longthornton, Lower Morden, Pollards Hill, Ravensbury, St Helier.

Wimbledon: Abbey, Cannon Hill, Dundonald, Hillside, Merton Park, Raynes Park, Trinity, Village, West Barnes, Wimbledon Park.

Newham
East Ham: Beckton, Boleyn, East Ham Central, East Ham North, East Ham South, Green Street East, Little Ilford, Manor Park, Royal Docks, Wall End.

West Ham: Canning Town North, Canning Town South, Custom House, Forest Gate North, Forest Gate South, Green Street West, Plaistow North, Plaistow South, Stratford and New Town, West Ham.

Redbridge and Waltham Forest
Chingford and Woodford Green: Chingford Green, Church End, Endlebury, Hale End and Highams Park, Hatch Lane, Larkswood, Monkhams, Valley.

Ilford North: Aldborough, Barkingside, Bridge, Clayhall, Fairlop, Fullwell, Hainault, Roding.

Ilford South: Chadwell, Clementswood, Cranbrook, Goodmayes, Loxford, Mayfield, Newbury, Seven Kings, Valentines.

Leyton and Wanstead: Cann Hall, Cathall, Forest, Grove Green, Leyton, Leytonstone, Snaresbrook, Wanstead.

Walthamstow: Chapel End, Higham Hill, High Street, Hoe Street, Lea Bridge, Markhouse, William Morris, Wood Street.

Sutton
Carshalton and Wallington: Beddington North, Beddington South, Carshalton Central, Carshalton South and Clockhouse, St Helier, The Wrythe, Wallington North, Wallington South, Wandle Valley.

Sutton and Cheam: Belmont, Cheam, Nonsuch, Stonecot, Sutton Central, Sutton North, Sutton South, Sutton West, Worcester Park.

Tower Hamlets
Bethnal Green and Bow: Bethnal Green North, Bethnal Green South, Bow East, Bow West, Mile End and Globe Town, St Dunstan's and Stepney Green, Spitalfields and Banglatown, Weavers, Whitechapel.

Poplar and Limehouse: Blackwall and Cubitt Town, Bromley-by-Bow, East India and Lansbury, Limehouse, Mile End East, Millwall, St Katharine's and Wapping, Shadwell.

Wandsworth
Battersea: Balham, Fairfield, Latchmere, Northcote, Queenstown, St Mary's Park, Shaftesbury.

Putney: East Putney, Roehampton, Southfields, Thamesfield, West Hill, West Putney.

Tooting: Bedford, Earlsfield, Furzedown, Graveney, Nightingale, Tooting, Wandsworth Common.

Westminster and City of London
Cities of London and Westminster: Bryanston and Dorset Square, Churchill, City of London, Hyde Park, Knightsbridge and Belgravia, Marylebone High Street, St James's, Tachbrook, Vincent Square, Warwick, West End.

Westminster North: Abbey Road, Bayswater, Church Street, Harrow Road, Lancaster Gate, Little Venice, Maida Vale, Queen's Park, Regent's Park, Westbourne.

Metropolitan Counties

Greater Manchester

Altrincham and Sale West: Altrincham, Ashton upon Mersey, Bowdon, Broadheath, Hale Barns, Hale Central, St Mary's, Timperley, Village.

Ashton-under-Lyne: Ashton Hurst, Ashton St Michael's, Ashton Waterloo, Droylsden East, Droylsden West, Failsworth East, Failsworth West, St Peter's.

Blackley and Broughton: Broughton, Charlestown, Cheetham, Crumpsall, Harpurhey, Higher Blackley, Kersal.

Bolton North East: Astley Bridge, Bradshaw, Breightmet, Bromley Cross, Crompton, Halliwell, Tonge with the Haulgh.

Bolton South East: Farnworth, Great Lever, Harper Green, Hulton, Kearsley, Little Lever and Darcy Lever, Rumworth.

Bolton West: Atherton, Heaton and Lostock, Horwich and Blackrod, Horwich North East, Smithills, Westhoughton North and Chew Moor, Westhoughton South.

Bury North: Church, East, Elton, Moorside, North Manor, Ramsbottom, Redvales, Tottington.

Bury South: Besses, Holyrood, Pilkington Park, Radcliffe East, Radcliffe North, Radcliffe West, St Mary's, Sedgley, Unsworth.

Cheadle: Bramhall North, Bramhall South, Cheadle and Gatley, Cheadle Hulme North, Cheadle Hulme South, Heald Green, Stepping Hill.

Denton and Reddish: Audenshaw, Denton North East, Denton South, Denton West, Dukinfield, Reddish North, Reddish South.

Hazel Grove: Bredbury and Woodley, Bredbury Green and Romiley, Hazel Grove, Marple North, Marple South, Offerton.

Heywood and Middleton: Bamford, Castleton, East Middleton, Hopwood Hall, Norden, North Heywood, North Middleton, South Middleton,
West Heywood, West Middleton.

Leigh: Astley Mosley Common, Atherleigh, Golborne and Lowton West, Leigh East, Leigh South, Leigh West, Lowton East, Tyldesley.

Makerfield: Abram, Ashton, Bryn, Hindley, Hindley Green, Orrell, Winstanley, Worsley Mesnes.

Manchester Central: Ancoats and Beswick, Ardwick, Deansgate, Hulme, Miles Platting and Newton Heath, Moss Side, Moston, Picadilly.

Manchester, Gorton: Fallowfield, Gorton and Abbey Hey, Levenshulme, Longsight, Rusholme, Whalley Range.

Manchester, Withington: Burnage, Chorlton, Chorlton Park, Didsbury East, Didsbury West, Old Moat, Withington.

Oldham East and Saddleworth: Alexandra, Crompton, Saddleworth North, Saddleworth South, Saddleworth West and Lees, St James’, St Mary's, Shaw, Waterhead.

Oldham West and Royton: Chadderton Central, Chadderton North, Chadderton South, Coldhurst, Hollinwood, Medlock Vale, Royton North, Royton South, Werneth.

Rochdale: Balderstone and Kirkholt, Central Rochdale, Healey, Kingsway, Littleborough Lakeside, Milkstone and Deeplish, Milnrow and Newhey, Smallbridge and Firgrove, Spotland and Falinge, Wardle and West Littleborough.

Salford and Eccles: Claremont, Eccles, Irwell Riverside, Langworthy, Ordsall, Pendlebury, Swinton North, Swinton South, Weaste and Seedley.

Stalybridge and Hyde: Dukinfield Stalybridge, Hyde Godley, Hyde Newton, Hyde Werneth, Longdendale, Mossley, Stalybridge North, Stalybridge South.

Stockport: Brinnington and Central, Davenport and Cale Green, Edgeley and Cheadle Heath, Heatons North, Heatons South, Manor.

Stretford and Urmston: Bucklow-St Martins, Clifford, Davyhulme East, Davyhulme West, Flixton, Gorse Hill, Longford, Stretford, Urmston.

Wigan: Aspull New Springs Whelley, Douglas, Ince, Pemberton, Shevington with Lower Ground, Standish with Langtree, Wigan Central, Wigan West.

Worsley and Eccles South: Barton, Boothstown and Ellenbrook, Cadishead, Irlam, Little Hulton, Walkden North, Walkden South, Winton, Worsley.

Wythenshawe and Sale East: Baguley, Brooklands, Northenden, Priory, Sale Moor, Sharston, Woodhouse Park.

Merseyside

Birkenhead: Bidston and St James, Birkenhead and Tranmere, Claughton, Oxton, Prenton, Rock Ferry.

Bootle: Church, Derby, Ford, Linacre, Litherland, Netherton and Orrell, St Oswald, Victoria.

Garston and Halewood: Allerton and Hunts Cross, Belle Vale, Cressington, Halewood North, Halewood South, Halewood West, Speke-Garston, Woolton.

Knowsley: Cherryfield, Kirkby Central, Longview, Northwood, Page Moss, Park, Prescot West, Roby, St Bartholomews, St Gabriels,
St Michaels, Shevington, Stockbridge, Swanside, Whitefield.

Liverpool, Riverside: Central, Greenbank, Kirkdale, Mossley Hill, Princes Park, Riverside, St Michael's.

Liverpool, Walton: Anfield, Clubmoor, County, Everton, Fazakerley, Warbreck.

Liverpool, Wavertree: Childwall, Church, Kensington and Fairfield, Old Swan, Picton, Wavertree.

Liverpool, West Derby: Croxteth, Knotty Ash, Norris Green, Tuebrook and Stoneycroft, West Derby, Yew Tree.

Sefton Central: Blundellsands, Harington, Manor, Molyneux, Park, Ravenmeols, Sudell.

Southport: Ainsdale, Birkdale, Cambridge, Duke's, Kew, Meols, Norwood.

St Helens North: Billinge and Seneley Green, Blackbrook, Earlestown, Haydock, Moss Bank, Newton, Parr, Rainford, Windle.

St Helens South and Whiston: Bold, Eccleston, Prescot East, Rainhill, Sutton, Thatto Heath, Town Centre, West Park, Whiston North, Whiston South.

Wallasey: Leasowe and Moreton East, Liscard, Moreton West and Saughall Massie, New Brighton, Seacombe, Wallasey.
 
Wirral South: Bebington, Bromborough, Clatterbridge, Eastham, Heswall.

Wirral West: Greasby, Frankby and Irby, Hoylake and Meols, Pensby and Thingwall, Upton, West Kirby and Thurstaston.

South Yorkshire

Barnsley Central: Central, Darton East, Darton West, Kingstone, Monk Bretton, Old Town, Royston, St Helens.

Barnsley East: Cudworth, Darfield, Hoyland Milton, North East, Rockingham, Stairfoot, Wombwell, Worsbrough.

Don Valley: Conisbrough and Denaby, Edlington and Warmsworth, Finningley, Hatfield, Rossington, Thorne, Torne Valley.

Doncaster Central: Armthorpe / Balby / Bessacarr and Cantley / Central / Edenthorpe, Kirk Sandall and Barnby Dun / Town Moor / Wheatley.

Doncaster North: Adwick, Askern Spa, Bentley, Great North Road, Mexborough, Sprotbrough, Stainforth and Moorends.

Penistone and Stocksbridge: East Ecclesfield, Dodworth, Penistone East, Penistone West, Stocksbridge and Upper Don, West Ecclesfield.

Rother Valley: Anston and Woodsetts, Dinnington, Hellaby, Holderness, Maltby, Rother Vale, Sitwell, Wales.

Rotherham: Boston Castle, Brinsworth and Catcliffe, Keppel, Rotherham East, Rotherham West, Valley, Wingfield.

Sheffield, Brightside and Hillsborough: Burngreave, Firth Park, Hillsborough, Shiregreen and Brightside, Southey.

Sheffield Central: Broomhill, Central, Manor Castle, Nether Edge, Walkley.

Sheffield, Hallam: Crookes, Dore and Totley, Ecclesall, Fulwood, Stannington.

Sheffield, Heeley: Arbourthorne, Beauchief and Greenhill, Gleadless Valley, Graves Park, Richmond.

Sheffield South East: Beighton, Birley, Darnall, Mosborough, Woodhouse.

Wentworth and Dearne: Dearne North, Dearne South, Hoober, Rawmarsh, Silverwood, Swinton, Wath, Wickersley.

Tyne and Wear

Blaydon: Birtley, Blaydon, Chopwell and Rowlands Gill, Crawcrook and Greenside, Dunston Hill and Whickham East, Lamesley, Ryton, Crookhill and Stella, Whickham North, Whickham South and Sunniside, Winlaton and High Spen.

Gateshead: Bridges, Chowdene, Deckham, Dunston and Teams, Felling, High Fell, Lobley Hill and Bensham, Low Fell, Saltwell, Windy Nook and Whitehills.

Houghton and Sunderland South: Copt Hill, Doxford, Hetton, Houghton, St Chad's, Sandhill, Shiney Row, Silksworth.

Jarrow: Bede, Boldon Colliery, Cleadon and East Boldon, Fellgate and Hedworth, Hebburn North, Hebburn South, Monkton, Pelaw and Heworth, Primrose, Wardley and Leam Lane.

Newcastle upon Tyne Central: Benwell and Scotswood, Blakelaw, Elswick, Fenham, Kenton, Westgate, West Gosforth, Wingrove.

Newcastle upon Tyne East: Byker, Dene, North Heaton, North Jesmond, Ouseburn, South Heaton, South Jesmond, Walker, Walkergate.

Newcastle upon Tyne North: Castle, Denton, East Gosforth, Fawdon, Lemington, Newburn, Parklands, Westerhope, Woolsington.

North Tyneside: Battle Hill, Benton, Camperdown, Howdon, Killingworth, Longbenton, Northumberland, Riverside, Wallsend, Weetslade.

South Shields: Beacon and Bents, Biddick and All Saints, Cleadon Park, Harton, Horsley Hill, Simonside and Rekendyke, Westoe, West Park, Whitburn and Marsden, Whiteleas.

Sunderland Central: Barnes, Fulwell, Hendon, Millfield, Pallion, Ryhope, St Michael's, St Peter's, Southwick.

Tynemouth: Chirton, Collingwood, Cullercoats, Monkseaton North, Monkseaton South, Preston, St Mary's, Tynemouth, Valley, Whitley Bay.

Washington and Sunderland West: Castle, Redhill, St Anne's, Washington Central, Washington East, Washington North, Washington South, Washington West.

West Midlands

Aldridge-Brownhills: Aldridge Central and South, Aldridge North and Walsall Wood, Brownhills, Pelsall, Rushall-Shelfield, Streetly.

Birmingham, Edgbaston: Bartley Green, Edgbaston, Harborne, Quinton.

Birmingham, Erdington: Erdington, Kingstanding, Stockland Green, Tyburn.

Birmingham, Hall Green: Hall Green, Moseley and Kings Heath, Sparkbrook, Springfield.

Birmingham, Hodge Hill: Bordesley Green, Hodge Hill, Shard End, Washwood Heath.

Birmingham, Ladywood: Aston, Ladywood, Nechells, Soho.

Birmingham, Northfield: Kings Norton, Longbridge, Northfield, Weoley.

Birmingham, Perry Barr: Handsworth Wood, Lozells and East Handsworth, Oscott, Perry Barr.

Birmingham, Selly Oak: Billesley, Bournville, Brandwood, Selly Oak.

Birmingham, Yardley: Acocks Green, Sheldon, South Yardley, Stechford and Yardley North.

Coventry North East: Foleshill, Henley, Longford, Lower Stoke, Upper Stoke, Wyken.

Coventry North West: Bablake, Holbrook, Radford, Sherbourne, Whoberley, Woodlands.

Coventry South: Binley and Willenhall, Cheylesmore, Earlsdon, St Michael's, Wainbody, Westwood.

Dudley North: Castle and Priory, Gornal, St James's, St Thomas's, Sedgley, Upper Gornal and Woodsetton.

Dudley South: Brierley Hill, Brockmoor and Pensnett, Kingswinford North and Wall Heath, Kingswinford South, Netherton, Woodside and St Andrews, Wordsley.

Halesowen and Rowley Regis: Belle Vale, Blackheath, Cradley Heath and Old Hill, Halesowen North, Halesowen South, Hayley Green and Cradley South, Rowley.

Meriden: Bickenhill, Blythe, Castle Bromwich, Chelmsley Wood, Dorridge and Hockley Heath, Kingshurst and Fordbridge, Knowle, Meriden, Smith's Wood.

Solihull: Elmdon, Lyndon, Olton, St Alphege, Shirley East, Shirley South, Shirley West, Silhill.

Stourbridge: Amblecote, Cradley and Foxcote, Lye and Wollescote, Norton, Pedmore and Stourbridge East, Quarry Bank and Dudley Wood, Wollaston and Stourbridge Town.

Sutton Coldfield: Sutton Four Oaks, Sutton New Hall, Sutton Trinity, Sutton Vesey.

Walsall North: Birchills Leamore, Blakenall, Bloxwich East, Bloxwich West, Short Heath, Willenhall North, Willenhall South.

Walsall South: Bentley and Darlaston North, Darlaston South, Paddock, Palfrey, Pheasey Park Farm, Pleck, St Matthew's.

Warley: Abbey, Bristnall, Langley, Old Warley, St Pauls, Smethwick, Soho and Victoria.

West Bromwich East: Charlemont with Grove Vale, Friar Park, Great Barr with Yew Tree, Greets Green and Lyng, Hateley Heath, Newton, West Bromwich Central.

West Bromwich West: Great Bridge, Oldbury, Princes End, Tipton Green, Tividale, Wednesbury North, Wednesbury South.

Wolverhampton North East: Bushbury North, Bushbury South and Low Hill, Fallings Park, Heath Town, Oxley, Wednesfield North, Wednesfield South.

Wolverhampton South East: Bilston East, Bilston North, Blakenhall, Coseley East, East Park, Ettingshall, Spring Vale.

Wolverhampton South West: Graiseley, Merry Hill, Park, Penn, St Peter's, Tettenhall Regis, Tettenhall Wightwick.

West Yorkshire

Batley and Spen: Batley East, Batley West, Birstall and Birkenshaw, Cleckheaton, Heckmondwike, Liversedge and Gomersal.

Bradford East: Bolton and Undercliffe, Bowling and Barkerend, Bradford Moor, Eccleshill, Idle and Thackley, Little Horton.

Bradford South: Great Horton, Queensbury, Royds, Tong, Wibsey, Wyke.

Bradford West: City, Clayton and Fairweather Green, Heaton, Manningham, Thornton and Allerton, Toller.

Calder Valley: Brighouse, Calder, Elland, Greetland and Stainland, Hipperholme and Lightcliffe, Luddendenfoot, Rastrick, Ryburn, Todmorden.

Colne Valley: Colne Valley, Crosland Moor and Netherton, Golcar, Holme Valley North, Holme Valley South, Lindley.

Dewsbury: Denby Dale, Dewsbury East, Dewsbury South, Dewsbury West, Kirkburton, Mirfield.

Elmet and Rothwell: Garforth and Swillington, Harewood, Kippax and Methley, Rothwell, Wetherby.

Halifax: Illingworth and Mixenden, Northowram and Shelf, Ovenden, Park, Skircoat, Sowerby Bridge, Town, Warley.

Hemsworth: Ackworth, North Elmsall and Upton, Crofton, Ryhill and Walton, Featherstone, Hemsworth, South Elmsall and South Kirkby, Wakefield South.

Huddersfield: Almondbury, Ashbrow, Dalton, Greenhead, Newsome.

Keighley: Craven, Ilkley, Keighley Central, Keighley East, Keighley West, Worth Valley.

Leeds Central: Beeston and Holbeck, Burmantofts and Richmond Hill, City and Hunslet, Hyde Park and Woodhouse, Middleton Park.

Leeds East: Cross Gates and Whinmoor, Gipton and Harehills, Killingbeck and Seacroft, Temple Newsam.

Leeds North East: Alwoodley, Chapel Allerton, Moortown, Roundhay.

Leeds North West: Adel and Wharfedale, Headingley, Otley and Yeadon, Weetwood.

Leeds West: Armley, Bramley and Stanningley, Farnley and Wortley, Kirkstall.

Morley and Outwood: Ardsley and Robin Hood, Morley North, Morley South, Stanley and Outwood East, Wrenthorpe and Outwood West.

Normanton, Pontefract and Castleford: Airedale and Ferry Fryston, Altofts and Whitwood, Castleford Central and Glasshoughton, Knottingley, Normanton, Pontefract North, Pontefract South.

Pudsey: Calverley and Farsley, Guiseley and Rawdon, Horsforth, Pudsey.

Shipley: Baildon, Bingley, Bingley Rural, Shipley, Wharfedale, Windhill and Wrose.

Wakefield: Horbury and South Ossett, Ossett, Wakefield East, Wakefield North, Wakefield Rural, Wakefield West.

Non-Metropolitan Counties and Unitary Authorities

Bath and North East Somerset
Bath: Bathwick, Combe Down, Kingsmead, Lambridge, Lansdown, Moorlands, Newbridge, Odd Down, Oldfield Park, Southdown, Twerton, Walcot, Westmoreland, Weston, Widcombe & Lyncombe.

North East Somerset: Bathavon North, Bathavon South, Chew Valley, Clutton and Farmborough, High Littleton, Keynsham East, Keynsham North, Keynsham South, Mendip, Midsomer Norton North, Midsomer Norton Redfield, Paulton, Peasedown, Publow and Whitchurch, Radstock, Saltford, Timsbury, Westfield.

See: North Somerset for North Somerset & Weston-Super-Mare constituencies and Somerset for Bridgwater and West Somerset, Somerton and Frome, Taunton Deane, Wells & Yeovil constituencies.

Bedfordshire and Luton

Bedford: Brickhill, Castle, Cauldwell, De Parys, Goldington, Harpur, Kempston East, Kempston North, Kempston South, Kingsbrook, Newnham, Putnoe, Queen's Park.

Luton North: Barnfield, Bramingham, Challney, Icknield, Leagrave, Lewsey, Limbury, Northwell, Saints, Sundon Park.

Luton South: Biscot, Caddington, Crawley, Dallow, Farley, High Town, Hyde and Slip End, Round Green, South, Stopsley, Wigmore.

Mid Bedfordshire: Ampthill, Aspley Guise, Barton-le-Clay, Clifton and Meppershall, Cranfield, Flitton, Greenfield and Pulloxhill, Flitwick East, Flitwick West, Harlington, Houghton, Haynes, Southill and Old Warden, Marston, Maulden and Clophill, Shefford, Campton and Gravenhurst, Shillington, Stondon and Henlow Camp, Silsoe, Streatley, Toddington, Turvey, Wilshamstead, Wootton.

North East Bedfordshire: Arlesey, Biggleswade Holme, Biggleswade Ivel, Biggleswade Stratton, Bromham, Carlton, Clapham, Eastcotts, Great Barford, Harrold, Langford and Henlow Village, Northill and Blunham, Oakley, Potton and Wensley, Riseley, Roxton, Sandy Ivel, Sandy Pinnacle, Sharnbrook, Stotfold.

South West Bedfordshire: All Saints, Chiltern, Dunstable Central, Eaton Bray, Grovebury, Heath and Reach, Houghton Hall, Icknield, Kensworth and Totternhoe, Linslade, Manshead, Northfields, Parkside, Planets, Plantation, Southcott, Stanbridge, Tithe Farm, Watling.

Berkshire
Bracknell: Bullbrook, Central Sandhurst, College Town, Crown Wood, Crowthorne, Finchampstead North, Finchampstead South, Great Hollands North, Great Hollands South, Hanworth, Harmans Water, Little Sandhurst and Wellington, Old Bracknell, Owlsmoor, Priestwood and Garth, Wildridings and Central, Wokingham Without.

Maidenhead: Belmont, Bisham and Cookham, Boyn Hill, Bray, Charvil, Coronation, Cox Green, Furze Platt, Hurley and Walthams, Hurst, Maidenhead Riverside, Oldfield, Pinkneys Green, Remenham, Sonning, Twyford, Wargrave and Ruscombe.

Newbury: Aldermaston, Basildon, Bucklebury, Chieveley, Clay Hill, Cold Ash, Compton, Downlands, Falkland, Greenham, Hungerford, Kintbury, Lambourn Valley, Northcroft, St Johns, Speen, Thatcham Central, Thatcham North, Thatcham South and Crookham, Thatcham West, Victoria.

Reading East: Abbey, Bulmershe and Whitegates, Caversham, Church, Katesgrove, Loddon, Mapledurham, Park, Peppard, Redlands, South Lake, Thames.

Reading West: Battle, Birch Copse, Calcot, Kentwood, Minster, Norcot, Pangbourne, Purley on Thames, Southcote, Theale, Tilehurst, Westwood, Whitley.

Slough: Baylis and Stoke, Britwell, Central, Chalvey, Cippenham Green, Cippenham Meadows, Farnham, Foxborough, Haymill, Kedermister, Langley St Mary's, Upton, Wexham Lea.

Windsor: Ascot, Ascot and Cheapside, Binfield with Warfield, Castle Without, Clewer East, Clewer North, Clewer South, Colnbrook with Poyle, Datchet, Eton and Castle, Eton Wick, Horton and Wraysbury, Old Windsor, Park, Sunningdale, Sunninghill and South Ascot, Warfield Harvest Ride.

Bristol
Bristol East: Brislington East, Brislington West, Eastville, Frome Vale, Hillfields, St George East, St George West, Stockwood.

Bristol North West: Avonmouth, Henbury, Henleaze, Horfield, Kingsweston, Lockleaze, Southmead, Stoke Bishop, Westbury-on-Trym.

Bristol South: Bedminster, Bishopsworth, Filwood, Hartcliffe, Hengrove, Knowle, Southville, Whitchurch Park, Windmill Hill.

Bristol West: Ashley, Bishopston, Cabot, Clifton, Clifton East, Cotham, Easton, Lawrence Hill, Redland.

Buckinghamshire
Aylesbury: Aston Clinton, Aylesbury Central, Bedgrove, Bledlow and Bradenham, Coldharbour, Elmhurst and Watermead, Gatehouse, Greater Hughenden, Lacey Green, Mandeville and Elm Farm, Oakfield, Quarrendon, Southcourt, Speen and the Hampdens, Stokenchurch and Radnage, Walton Court and Hawkslade, Wendover.

Beaconsfield: Beaconsfield North, Beaconsfield South, Beaconsfield West, Bourne End-cum-Hedsor, Burnham Beeches, Burnham Church, Burnham Lent Rise, Denham North, Denham South, Dorney and Burnham South, Farnham Royal, Flackwell Heath and Little Marlow, Gerrards Cross East and Denham South West, Gerrards Cross North, Gerrards Cross South, Hedgerley and Fulmer, Iver Heath, Iver Village and Richings Park, Marlow North and West, Marlow South East, Stoke Poges, Taplow, The Wooburns, Wexham and Iver West.

Buckingham: Bierton, Brill, Buckingham North, Buckingham South, Cheddington, Edlesborough, Great Brickhill, Great Horwood, Grendon Underwood, Haddenham, Icknield, Long Crendon, Luffield Abbey, Marsh Gibbon, Newton Longville, Pitstone, Quainton, Steeple Claydon, Stewkley, The Risboroughs, Tingewick, Waddesdon, Weedon, Wing, Wingrave, Winslow.

Chesham and Amersham: Amersham Common, Amersham-on-the-Hill, Amersham Town, Asheridge Vale and Lowndes, Ashley Green, Latimer and Chenies, Austenwood, Ballinger, South Heath and Chartridge, Central, Chalfont Common, Chalfont St Giles, Chesham Bois and Weedon Hill, Cholesbury, The Lee and Bellingdon, Gold Hill, Great Missenden, Hilltop and Townsend, Holmer Green, Little Chalfont, Little Missenden, Newtown, Penn and Coleshill, Prestwood and Heath End, Ridgeway, St Mary's and Waterside, Seer Green, Vale.

Wycombe: Abbey, Booker and Cressex, Bowerdean, Chiltern Rise, Disraeli, Downley and Plomer Hill, Greater Marlow, Hambleden Valley, Hazlemere North, Hazlemere South, Micklefield, Oakridge and Castlefield, Ryemead, Sands, Terriers and Amersham Hill, Totteridge, Tylers Green and Loudwater.

See: Milton Keynes for Milton Keynes North & South constituencies.

Cambridgeshire and Peterborough
Cambridge: Abbey, Arbury, Castle, Cherry Hinton, Coleridge, East Chesterton, King's Hedges, Market, Newnham, Petersfield, Romsey, Trumpington, West Chesterton.

Huntingdon: Alconbury and The Stukeleys, Brampton, Buckden, Fenstanton, Godmanchester, Gransden and The Offords, Huntingdon East, Huntingdon North, Huntingdon West, Kimbolton and Staughton, Little Paxton, St Ives East, St Ives South, St Ives West, St Neots Eaton Ford, St Neots Eaton Socon, St Neots Eynesbury, St Neots Priory Park, The Hemingfords.

North East Cambridgeshire: Bassenhally, Benwick, Coates and Eastrea, Birch, Clarkson, Delph, Doddington, Downham Villages, Elm and Christchurch, Hill, Kingsmoor, Kirkgate, Lattersey, Littleport East, Littleport West, Manea, March East, March North, March West, Medworth, Parson Drove and Wisbech St Mary, Peckover, Roman Bank, St Andrews, St Marys, Slade Lode, Staithe, Sutton, The Mills, Waterlees, Wenneye, Wimblington.

North West Cambridgeshire: Barnack, Earith, Ellington, Elton and Folksworth, Fletton, Glinton and Wittering, Northborough, Orton Longueville, Orton Waterville, Orton With Hampton, Ramsey, Sawtry, Somersham, Stanground Central, Stanground East, Stilton, Upwood and The Raveleys, Warboys and Bury, Yaxley and Farcet.

Peterborough: Bretton North, Bretton South, Central, Dogsthorpe, East, Eye and Thorney, Newborough, North, Park, Paston, Ravensthorpe, Walton, Werrington North, Werrington South, West.

South Cambridgeshire: Bar Hill, Barton, Bassingbourn, Bourn, Caldecote, Comberton, Cottenham, Duxford, Fowlmere and Foxton, Gamlingay, Girton, Hardwick, Harston and Hauxton, Haslingfield and The Eversdens, Longstanton, Melbourn, Meldreth, Orwell and Barrington, Papworth and Elsworth, Queen Edith's, Sawston, Swavesey, The Abingtons, The Mordens, The Shelfords and Stapleford, Whittlesford.

South East Cambridgeshire: Balsham, Bottisham, Burwell, Cheveley, Dullingham Villages, Ely East, Ely North, Ely South, Ely West, Fordham Villages, Fulbourn, Haddenham, Histon and Impington, Isleham, Linton, Milton, Soham North, Soham South, Stretham, Teversham, The Swaffhams, The Wilbrahams, Waterbeach, Willingham and Over.

Cheshire
City of Chester: Blacon Hall, Blacon Lodge, Boughton, Boughton Heath, Christleton, City & St Anne's, college, Curzon & Westminster, Dodleston, Handbridge & St Mary's, Hoole All Saints, Hoole Groves, Huntington, Lache Park, Mollington, Newton Brook, Newton St Michaels, Saughall, Upton Grange, Upton Westlea, Vicars Cross.

Congleton: Alsager Central, Alsager East, Alsager West, Astbury, Brereton, Buglawton, Congleton Central, Congleton North, Congleton North West, Congleton South, Congleton West, Dane Valley, Holmes Chapel, Lawton, Middlewich Cledford, Middlewich Kinderton, Odd Rode, Sandbach East, Sandbach North, Sandbach West.

Crewe and Nantwich: Alexandra, Barony Weaver, Birchin, Coppenhall, Delamere, Englesea, Grosvenor, Haslington, Leighton, Maw Green, St Barnabas, St John's, St Mary's, Shavington, Valley, Waldron, Wellington, Wells Green, Willaston, Wistaston Green, Wybunbury.

Eddisbury: Acton, Audlem, Barrow, Bunbury, Cuddington & Oakmere, Davenham & Moulton, Farndon, Kelsall, Malpas, Mara, Minshull, Peckforton, Tarvin, Tattenhall, Tilston, Waverton, Winsford Over, Winsford Swanlow, Winsford Verdin, Winsford Wharton, Wrenbury.

Ellesmere Port and Neston: Burton & Ness, Central, Elton, Grange, Groves, Ledsham, Little Neston, Mickle Trafford, Neston, Parkgate, Pooltown, Rivacre, Riverside, Rossmore, Stanlow & Wolverham, Strawberry Fields, Sutton, Sutton Green & Manor, Westminster, Whitby, Willaston & Thornton.

Halton: Appleton, Birchfield, Broadheath, Castlefields, Ditton, Farnworth, Grange, Hale, Halton Brook, Halton View, Heath, Hough Green, Kingsway, Mersey, Riverside.

Macclesfield: Bollington Central, Bollington East, Bollington West, Disley & Lyme Handley, Gawsworth, Henbury, Macclesfield Bollinbrook, Macclesfield Broken Cross, Macclesfield Central, Macclesfield East, Macclesfield Hurdsfield, Macclesfield Ivy, Macclesfield Ryles, Macclesfield South, Macclesfield Tytherington, Macclesfield West, Poynton Central, Poynton East, Poynton West, Prestbury, Rainow, Sutton.

Tatton: Alderley Edge, Barnton, Chelford, Cogshall, Dean Row, Fulshaw, Handforth, High Legh, Hough, Knutsford Bexton, Knutsford Nether, Knutsford Norbury Booths, Knutsford Over, Lacey Green, Lostock & Wincham, Mere, Mobberley, Morley & Styal, Plumley, Rudheath & South Witton, Seven Oaks & Marston, Shakerley.

Weaver Vale: Beechwood, Daresbury, Forest, Frodsham North, Frodsham South, Halton Lea, Hartford & Whitegate, Helsby, Kingsley, Leftwich & Kingsmead, Milton Weaver, Northwich Castle, Northwich Winnington, Northwich Witton, Norton North, Norton South, Weaverham, Windmill Hill.

See: Warrington for Warrington North & South constituencies.

Cornwall
Camborne and Redruth: Camborne North, Camborne South, Camborne West, Constantine, Gweek and Mawnan, Gwinear, Gwithian and Hayle East, Hayle North, Hayle South, Illogan North, Illogan South, Mabe and Budock, Mount Hawke, Redruth North, Redruth South, St Day, Lanner and Carharrack, Stithians, Wendron.

North Cornwall: Allan, Altarnun, Blisland and St Breward, Bodmin St Mary's, Bodmin St Petroc, Bude, Camelford, Camelot, Grenville, Lanivet, Launceston, Marhamchurch, North Petherwin, Padstow and District, Poughill and Stratton, St Endellion and St Kew, St Minver, South Petherwin, Stokeclimsland, Tremaine, Valency, Wadebridge, Week St Mary and Whitstone.

South East Cornwall: Callington, Calstock, Deviock and Sheviock, Dobwalls and District, Duloe, Lansallos and Pelynt, Landrake and St Dominick,
Lanteglos and St Veep, Liskeard North, Liskeard South, Looe and St Martin, Lynher, Menheniot and St Ive, Millbrook, Rame Peninsula, St Cleer and St Neot, St Germans, Saltash Burraton, Saltash Essa, Saltash Pill, Saltash St Stephens, Torpoint East, Torpoint West.

St Austell and Newquay: Bethel, Crinnis, Edgcumbe North, Edgcumbe South, Fowey and Tywardreath, Gannel, Gover, Mevagissey, Mount Charles, Poltair, Rialton, Rock, St Blaise, St Columb, St Enoder, St Ewe, St Stephen, Treverbyn.

St Ives: Breage and Crowan, Goldsithney, Grade-Ruan and Landewednack, Gulval and Heamoor, Helston North, Helston South, Lelant and Carbis Bay, Ludgvan and Towednack, Madron and Zennor, Marazion and Perranuthnoe, Meneage, Morvah, Mullion, Pendeen and St Just, Penzance Central, Penzance East, Penzance Promenade, Penzance South, Porthleven and Sithney, St Buryan, St Erth and St Hilary, St Ives North, St Ives South St Keverne, The Isles of Scilly.

Truro and Falmouth: Arwenack, Boscawen, Boslowick, Carland, Feock and Kea, Kenwyn and Chacewater, Moresk, Mylor, Newlyn and Goonhavern, Penryn, Penwerris, Perranporth, Probus, Roseland, St Agnes, Tregolls, Trehaverne and Gloweth, Trescobeas.

Cumbria
Barrow and Furness: Barrow Island, Broughton, Central, Crake Valley, Dalton North, Dalton South, Hawcoat, Hindpool, Low Furness and Swarthmoor, Newbarns, Ormsgill, Parkside, Risedale, Roosecote, Ulverston Central, Ulverston East, Ulverston North, Ulverston South, Ulverston Town, Ulverston West, Walney North, Walney South.

Carlisle: Belah, Belle Vue, Botcherby, Burgh, Castle, Currock, Dalston, Denton Holme, Harraby, Morton, St Aidans, Stanwix Urban, Upperby, Wetheral, Yewdale.

Copeland: Arlecdon, Beckermet, Bootle, Bransty, Cleator Moor North, Cleator Moor South, Crummock, Dalton, Derwent Valley, Distington, Egremont North, Egremont South, Ennerdale, Frizington, Gosforth, Harbour, Haverigg, Hensingham, Hillcrest, Holborn Hill, Kells, Keswick, Millom Without, Mirehouse, Moresby, Newtown, St Bees, Sandwith, Seascale.

Penrith and The Border: Alston Moor, Appleby (Appleby), Appleby (Bongate), Askham, Brampton, Brough, Crosby Ravensworth, Dacre, Eamont, Great Corby and Geltsdale, Greystoke, Hartside, Hayton, Hesket, Irthing, Kirkby Stephen, Kirkby Thore, Kirkoswald, Langwathby, Lazonby, Long Marton, Longtown & Rockcliffe, Lyne, Morland, Orton With Tebay, Penrith Carleton, Penrith East, Penrith North, Penrith Pategill, Penrith South, Penrith West, Ravenstonedale, Shap, Skelton, Stanwix Rural, Ullswater, Warcop.

Westmorland and Lonsdale: Arnside & Beetham, Burneside, Burton & Holme, Cartmel, Coniston, Crooklands, Grange, Hawkshead, Holker, Kendal Castle, Kendal Far Cross, Kendal Fell, Kendal Glebelands, Kendal Heron Hill, Kendal Highgate, Kendal Kirkland, Kendal Mintsfeet, Kendal Nether, Kendal Oxenholme, Kendal Parks, Kendal Stonecross, Kendal Strickland, Kendal Underley, Kirkby Lonsdale, Lakes Ambleside, Lakes Grasmere, Levens, Lyth Valley, Milnthorpe, Natland, Sedbergh, Staveley-in-Cartmel, Staveley-in-Westmorland, Whinfell, Windermere Applethwaite, Windermere Bowness North, Windermere Bowness South, Windermere Town.

Workington: All Saints, Aspatria, Boltons, Broughton St Bridget's, Christchurch, Clifton, Ellen, Ellenborough, Ewanrigg, Flimby, Harrington, Holme, Marsh, Moorclose, Moss Bay, Netherhall, St John's, St Michael's, Seaton, Silloth, Solway, Stainburn, Wampool, Waver, Wharrels.

Derbyshire and Derby
Amber Valley: Alfreton, Codnor and Waingroves, Heage and Ambergate, Heanor and Loscoe, Heanor East, Heanor West, Ironville and Riddings, Kilburn, Denby and Holbrook, Langley Mill and Aldercar, Ripley, Ripley and Marehay, Shipley Park, Horsley and Horsley Woodhouse, Somercotes, Swanwick, Wingfield.

Bolsover: Barlborough, Blackwell, Bolsover North West, Bolsover South, Bolsover West, Clowne North, Clowne South, Elmton-with-Creswell, Holmewood and Heath, Pilsley and Morton, Pinxton, Pleasley, Scarcliffe, Shirebrook East, Shirebrook Langwith, Shirebrook North West, Shirebrook South East, Shirebrook South West, Shirland, South Normanton East, South Normanton West, Sutton, Tibshelf, Whitwell.

Chesterfield: Brimington North, Brimington South, Brockwell, Dunston, Hasland, Hollingwood and Inkersall, Holmebrook, Linacre, Loundsley Green, Middlecroft and Poolsbrook, Moor, Old Whittington, Rother, St Helen's, St Leonard's, Walton, West.

Derby North: Abbey, Chaddesden, Darley, Derwent, Littleover, Mackworth, Mickleover.

Derby South: Alvaston, Arboretum, Blagreaves, Boulton, Chellaston, Normanton, Sinfin.

Derbyshire Dales: Alport, Ashbourne North, Ashbourne South, Bakewell, Bradwell, Brailsford, Calver, Carsington Water, Chatsworth, Clifton and Bradley, Crich, Darley Dale, Dovedale and Parwich, Doveridge and Sudbury, Hartington and Taddington, Hathersage and Eyam, Hulland, Lathkill and Bradford, Litton and Longstone, Masson, Matlock All Saints, Matlock St Giles, Norbury, South West Parishes, Stanton, Tideswell, Winster and South Darley, Wirksworth.

Erewash: Abbotsford, Breaston, Cotmanhay, Derby Road East, Derby Road West, Draycott, Hallam Fields, Ilkeston Central, Ilkeston North, Kirk Hallam, Little Hallam, Long Eaton Central, Nottingham Road, Old Park, Sandiacre North, Sandiacre South, Sawley, Wilsthorpe.

High Peak: Barms, Blackbrook, Burbage, Buxton Central, Chapel East, Chapel West, Corbar, Cote Heath, Dinting, Gamesley, Hadfield North, Hadfield South, Hayfield, Hope Valley, Howard Town, Limestone Peak, New Mills East, New Mills West, Old Glossop, Padfield, St John's, Sett, Simmondley, Stone Bench, Temple, Tintwistle, Whaley Bridge, Whitfield.

Mid Derbyshire: Allestree, Belper Central, Belper East, Belper North, Belper South, Duffield, Little Eaton and Breadsall, Oakwood, Ockbrook and Borrowash, Spondon, Stanley, West Hallam and Dale Abbey.

North East Derbyshire: Ashover, Barlow and Holmesfield, Barrow Hill and New Whittington, Brampton and Walton, Clay Cross North, Clay Cross South, Coal Aston, Dronfield North, Dronfield South, Dronfield Woodhouse, Eckington North, Eckington South, Gosforth Valley, Grassmoor, Killamarsh East, Killamarsh West, Lowgates and Woodthorpe, North Wingfield Central, Renishaw, Ridgeway and Marsh Lane, Tupton, Unstone, Wingerworth.

South Derbyshire: Aston, Church Gresley, Etwall, Hartshorne and Ticknall, Hatton, Hilton, Linton, Melbourne, Midway, Newhall and Stanton, North West, Repton, Seales, Stenson, Swadlincote, Willington and Findern, Woodville.

Devon, Plymouth and Torbay

Central Devon: Ashburton and Buckfastleigh, Boniface, Bovey, Bradninch, Cadbury, Chagford, Chudleigh, Drewsteignton, Exbourne, Exe Valley, Hatherleigh, Haytor, Kenn Valley, Lawrence, Lew Valley, Moorland, Newbrooke, North Tawton, Okehampton East, Okehampton West, Sandford and Creedy, Silverton, South Tawton, Taw, Taw Vale, Teignbridge North, Teign Valley, Upper Yeo, Way, Yeo.

East Devon: Broadclyst, Budleigh, Clyst Valley, Exmouth Brixington, Exmouth Halsdon, Exmouth Littleham, Exmouth Town, Exmouth Withycombe Raleigh, Newton Poppleford and Harpford, Ottery St Mary Rural, Ottery St Mary Town, Raleigh, Sidmouth Rural, Sidmouth Sidford, Sidmouth Town, St Loyes, Topsham, Whimple, Woodbury and Lympstone.

Exeter: Alphington, Cowick, Duryard, Exwick, Heavitree, Mincinglake, Newtown, Pennsylvania, Pinhoe, Polsloe, Priory, St David's, St James, St Leonard's, St Thomas, Whipton & Barton.

Newton Abbot: Ambrook, Bishopsteignton, Bradley, Buckland and Milber, Bushell, college, Dawlish Central and North East, Dawlish South West, Ipplepen, Kenton with Starcross, Kerswell-with-Combe, Kingsteignton East, Kingsteignton West, Shaldon and Stokeinteignhead, Teignmouth Central, Teignmouth East, Teignmouth West.

North Devon: Bickington and Roundswell, Bishop's Nympton, Bratton Fleming, Braunton East, Braunton West, Central Town, Chittlehampton, Chulmleigh, Combe Martin, Forches and Whiddon Valley, Fremington, Georgeham and Mortehoe, Heanton Punchardon, Ilfracombe Central, Ilfracombe East, Ilfracombe West, Instow, Landkey, Swimbridge and Taw, Longbridge, Lynton and Lynmouth, Marwood, Newport, North Molton, Pilton, South Molton, Witheridge, Yeo Valley.

Plymouth, Moor View: Budshead, Eggbuckland, Ham, Honicknowle, Moor View, St Budeaux, Southway.

Plymouth, Sutton and Devonport: Compton, Devonport, Drake, Efford and Lipson, Peverell, St Peter and the Waterfront, Stoke, Sutton and Mount Gould.

South West Devon: Bickleigh and Shaugh, Charterlands, Cornwood and Sparkwell, Erme Valley, Ivybridge Central, Ivybridge Filham, Ivybridge Woodlands, Plympton Chaddlewood, Plympton Erle, Plympton St Mary, Plymstock Dunstone, Plymstock Radford, Newton and Noss, Wembury and Brixton, Yealmpton.

Tiverton and Honiton: Axminster Rural, Axminster Town, Beer and Branscombe, Canonsleigh, Castle, Clare and Shuttern, Coly Valley, Cranmore, Cullompton North, Cullompton Outer, Cullompton South, Dunkeswell, Feniton and Buckerell, Halberton, Honiton St Michael's, Honiton St Paul's, Lower Culm, Lowman, Newbridges, Otterhead, Seaton, Tale Vale, Trinity, Upper Culm, Westexe, Yarty.

Torbay: Clifton-with-Maidenway, Cockington-with-Chelston, Ellacombe, Goodrington-with-Roselands, Preston, Roundham-with-Hyde, St Marychurch, Shiphay-with-the-Willows, Tormohun, Watcombe, Wellswood.

Torridge and West Devon: Appledore, Bere Ferrers, Bideford East, Bideford North, Bideford South, Bridestowe, Broadheath, Buckland Monachorum, Burrator, Clinton, Clovelly Bay, Coham Bridge, Forest, Hartland and Bradworthy, Holsworthy, Kenwith, Lydford, Mary Tavy, Milton Ford, Monkleigh and Littleham, Northam, Orchard Hill, Shebbear and Langtree, Tamarside, Tavistock North, Tavistock South, Tavistock South West, Three Moors, Thrushel, Torrington, Two Rivers, Waldon, Walkham, Westward Ho!, Winkleigh.

Totnes: Allington and Loddiswell, Avon and Harbourne, Berry Head-with-Furzeham, Blatchcombe, Churston-with-Galmpton,  Dartington, Dartmouth and Kingswear, Dartmouth Townstal, East Dart, Eastmoor, Kingsbridge East, Kingsbridge North, Marldon, Salcombe and Malborough, Saltstone, Skerries, South Brent, St Mary's-with-Summercombe, Stokenham, Thurlestone, Totnes Bridgetown, Totnes Town, West Dart, Westville and Alvington.

Dorset, Bournemouth and Poole
Bournemouth East: Boscombe East and Pokesdown, Boscombe West, East Cliff and Springbourne, East Southbourne and Tuckton, Littledown and Iford, Moordown, Muscliff and Strouden Park, Queen's Park, West Southbourne.

Bournemouth West: Alderney and Bourne Valley, Bournemouth Central, Kinson, Redhill and Northbourne, Talbot and Branksome Woods, Wallisdown and Winton West, Westbourne and West Cliff, Winton East.

Christchurch: Ameysford, Burton and Winkton, Ferndown Central, Ferndown Links, Grange, Highcliffe and Walkford, Jumpers, Longham, Mudeford and Friars Cliff, Parley, Portfield, Purewell and Stanpit, St Catherine's and Hurn, St Leonards and St Ives East, St Leonards and St Ives West, Stapehill, Town Centre, West Highcliffe, West Moors.

Mid Dorset and North Poole: Bearwood and Merley, Bere Regis, Broadstone, Canford Heath, Colehill East, Colehill West, Corfe Mullen Central, Corfe Mullen North, Corfe Mullen South, Lytchett Matravers, Lytchett Minster and Upton East, Lytchett Minster and Upton West, St Martin, Wareham, Wimborne Minster.

North Dorset: Abbey, Alderholt, Blackmore, Blandford Damory Down, Blandford Hilltop, Blandford Langton St Leonards, Blandford Old Town, Blandford Station, Bourton and District, Bulbarrow, Cranborne Chase, Crane, Gillingham Town, Handley Vale, Hill Forts, Holt, Lodbourne, Lydden Vale, Marnhull, Milton, Motcombe and Ham, Portman, Riversdale, Shaftesbury Central, Shaftesbury Christy's, Shaftesbury Grosvenor, Shaftesbury Underhill, Stour, Stour Valley, The Beacon, The Lower Tarrants, The Stours, Three Cross and Potterne, Verwood Dewlands, Verwood Newtown, Verwood Stephen's Castle, Wyke.

Poole: Branksome West, Canford Cliffs, Creekmoor, Hamworthy, Newtown and Heatherlands, Oakdale, Parkstone, Penn Hill, Poole Town.

South Dorset: Castle, Creech Barrow, Langton, Littlemoor, Melcombe Regis, Preston, Radipole, Swanage North, Swanage South, Tophill East, Tophill West, Underhill, Upwey and Broadwey, West Purbeck, Westham East, Westham North, Westham West, Wey Valley, Weymouth East, Weymouth West, Winfrith, Wool, Wyke Regis.

West Dorset: Beaminster, Bradford Abbas, Bradpole, Bridport North, Bridport South and Bothenhampton, Broadmayne, Broadwindsor, Burton Bradstock, Cam Vale, Charminster and Cerne Valley, Charmouth, Chesil Bank, Chickerell, Chideock and Symondsbury, Dorchester East, Dorchester North, Dorchester South, Dorchester West, Frome Valley, Halstock, Loders, Lyme Regis, Maiden Newton, Marshwood Vale, Netherbury, Piddle Valley, Puddletown, Queen Thorne, Sherborne East, Sherborne West, Winterborne St Martin, Yetminster.

Durham and Darlington
Bishop Auckland: Barnard Castle East, Barnard Castle North, Barnard Castle West, Bishop Auckland Town, Barningham and Ovington, Byerley, Cockfield, Cockton Hill, Cotherstone with Lartington, Coundon, Dene Valley, Eggleston, Escomb, Etherley, Evenwood, Gainford and Winston, Greta, Hamsterley and South Bedburn, Henknowle, Ingleton, Lynesack, Low Spennymoor and Tudhoe Grange, Middlestone, Middleton-in-Teesdale, Ramshaw and Lands, Romaldkirk, Spennymoor, Startforth, Streatlam and Whorlton, Sunnydale, Thickley, Tudhoe. West Auckland, Woodhouse Close.

City of Durham: Bearpark and Witton Gilbert, Belmont, Brancepeth, Langley Moor and Meadowfield, Brandon, Carrville and Gilesgate Moor, Cassop-cum-Quarrington, Coxhoe, Crossgate and Framwelgate, Deerness, Elvet, Framwellgate Moor, Neville's Cross, New Brancepeth and Ushaw Moor, Newton Hall North, Newton Hall South, Pelaw and Gilesgate, Pittington and West Rainton, St Nicholas, Shadforth and Sherburn, Shincliffe.

Darlington: Bank Top, Central, Cockerton East, Cockerton West, college, Eastbourne, Faverdale, Harrowgate Hill, Haughton East, Haughton North, Haughton West, Hummersknott, Lascelles, Lingfield, Mowden, Northgate, North Road, Park East, Park West, Pierremont.

Easington: Acre Rigg, Blackhalls, Dawdon, Dene House, Deneside, Easington Colliery, Easington Village and South Hetton, Eden Hill, Haswell and Shotton, Horden North, Horden South, Howletch, Hutton Henry, Murton East, Murton West, Passfield, Seaham Harbour, Seaham North.

North Durham: Annfield Plain, Bournmoor, Catchgate, Chester Central, Chester East, Chester North, Chester South, Chester West, Craghead and South Stanley, Edmondsley and Waldridge, Grange Villa and West Pelton, Havannah, Kimblesworth and Plawsworth, Lumley, North Lodge, Ouston, Pelton, Pelton Fell, Sacriston, South Moor, Stanley Hall, Tanfield, Urpeth.

North West Durham: Benfieldside, Blackhill, Burnhope, Burnopfield, Castleside, Consett East, Consett North, Consett South, Cornsay, Crook North, Crook South, Delves Lane, Dipton, Ebchester and Medomsley, Esh, Howden, Hunwick, Lanchester, Leadgate, St John's Chapel, Stanhope, Tow Law and Stanley, Wheatbottom and Helmington Row, Willington Central, Willington West End, Wolsingham and Witton-le-Wear.

Sedgefield: Bishop Middleham and Cornforth, Broom, Chilton, Ferryhill, Fishburn and Old Trimdon, Greenfield Middridge, Heighington and Coniscliffe, Hurworth, Middleton St George, Neville and Simpasture, New Trimdon and Trimdon Grange, Sadberge and Whessoe, Sedgefield, Shafto St Marys, Thornley and Wheatley Hill, West, Wingate, Woodham.

See: Hartlepool for Hartlepool constituency and Stockton-on-Tees for Stockton North and South constituencies.

East Riding of Yorkshire, Kingston upon Hull and North and North East Lincolnshire
Beverley and Holderness: Beverley Rural, Mid Holderness, Minster and Woodmansey, North Holderness, St Mary's, South East Holderness, South West Holderness.

Brigg and Goole: Axholme Central, Axholme North, Axholme South, Brigg and Wolds, Broughton and Appleby, Burringham and Gunness, Burton upon Stather and Winterton, Goole North, Goole South, Snaith, Airmyn, Rawcliffe and Marshland.

Cleethorpes: Barton, Croft Baker, Ferry, Haverstoe, Humberston and New Waltham, Immingham, Sidney Sussex, Waltham, Wolds.

East Yorkshire: Bridlington Central and Old Town, Bridlington North, Bridlington South, Driffield and Rural, East Wolds and Coastal, Pocklington Provincial, Wolds Weighton.

Great Grimsby: East Marsh, Freshney, Heneage, Park, Scartho, South, West Marsh, Yarborough.

Haltemprice and Howden: Cottingham North, Cottingham South, Dale, Howden, Howdenshire, South Hunsley, Tranby, Willerby and Kirk Ella.

Kingston upon Hull East: Drypool, Holderness, Ings, Longhill, Marfleet, Southcoates East, Southcoates West, Sutton.

Kingston upon Hull North: Avenue, Beverley, Bransholme East, Bransholme West, Bricknell, Kings Park, Newland, Orchard Park and Greenwood, university.

Kingston upon Hull West and Hessle: Boothferry, Derringham, Hessle, Myton, Newington, Pickering, St Andrew's.

Scunthorpe: Ashby, Bottesford, Brumby, Crosby and Park, Frodingham, Kingsway with Lincoln Gardens, Ridge, Town.

See: Lincolnshire for Boston and Skegness, Gainsborough, Grantham and Stamford, Lincoln, Louth and Horncastle, Sleaford and North Hykeham & South Holland constituencies.

East Sussex and Brighton and Hove
Bexhill and Battle: Battle Town, Central, Collington, Cross In Hand/Five Ashes, Crowhurst, Darwell, Ewhurst and Sedlescombe,  Heathfield East, Heathfield North and Central, Herstmonceux, Kewhurst, Ninfield and Hooe with Wartling, Old Town, Pevensey and Westham, Rother Levels, Sackville, St Marks, St Michaels, St Stephens, Salehurst, Sidley, Ticehurst and Etchingham.

Brighton, Kemptown: East Brighton, East Saltdean and Telscombe Cliffs, Moulsecoomb and Bevendean, Peacehaven East, Peacehaven North, Peacehaven West, Queen's Park, Rottingdean Coastal, Woodingdean.

Brighton, Pavilion: Hanover and Elm Grove, Hollingdean and Stanmer, Patcham, Preston Park, Regency, St Peter's and North Laine, Withdean.

Eastbourne: Devonshire, Hampden Park, Langney, Meads, Old Town, Ratton, St Anthony's, Sovereign, Upperton, Willingdon.

Hastings and Rye: Ashdown, Baird, Braybrooke, Brede Valley, Castle, Central St Leonards, Conquest, Eastern Rother, Gensing, Hollington, Marsham, Maze Hill, Old Hastings, Ore, Rye, St Helens, Silverhill, Tressell, West St Leonards, Wishing Tree.

Hove: Brunswick and Adelaide, Central Hove, Goldsmid, Hangleton and Knoll, Hove Park, North Portslade, South Portslade, Westbourne, Wish.

Lewes: Alfriston, Barcombe and Hamsey, Chailey and Wivelsfield, Ditchling and Westmeston, East Dean, Kingston, Lewes Bridge, Lewes Castle, Lewes Priory, Newhaven Denton and Meeching, Newhaven Valley, Newick, Ouse Valley and Ringmer, Plumpton, Streat, East Chiltington and St John (Without), Polegate North, Polegate South, Seaford Central, Seaford East, Seaford North, Seaford South, Seaford West.

Wealden: Buxted and Maresfield, Chiddingly and East Hoathly, Crowborough East, Crowborough Jarvis Brook, Crowborough North, Crowborough St. Johns, Crowborough West, Danehill/Fletching/Nutley, Forest Row, Framfield, Frant/Withyham, Hailsham Central and North, Hailsham East, Hailsham South and West, Hartfield, Hellingly, Horam, Mayfield, Rotherfield, Uckfield Central, Uckfield New Town, Uckfield North, Uckfield Ridgewood, Wadhurst.

Essex, Southend-on-Sea and Thurrock
Basildon and Billericay: Billericay East, Billericay West, Burstead, Crouch, Fryerns, Laindon Park, Lee Chapel North, St Martin's.

Braintree: Bocking Blackwater, Bocking North, Bocking South, Braintree Central, Braintree East, Braintree South, Bumpstead, Cressing and Stisted, Gosfield and Greenstead Green, Great Notley and Braintree West, Halstead St Andrews, Halstead Trinity, Hedingham and Maplestead, Panfield, Rayne, Stour Valley North, Stour Valley South, The Three Colnes, Three Fields, Upper Colne, Yeldham.

Brentwood and Ongar: Brentwood North, Brentwood South, Brentwood West, Brizes and Doddinghurst, Chipping Ongar, Greensted and Marden Ash, Herongate, Ingrave and West Horndon, High Ongar, Willingale and The Rodings, Hutton Central, Hutton East, Hutton North, Hutton South, Ingatestone, Fryerning and Mountnessing, Lambourne, Moreton and Fyfield, North Weald Bassett, Passingford, Pilgrims Hatch, Shelley, Shenfield, South Weald, Tipps Cross, Warley.

Castle Point: Appleton, Boyce, Canvey Island Central, Canvey Island East, Canvey Island North, Canvey Island South, Canvey Island West, Canvey Island Winter Gardens, Cedar Hall, St George's, St James, St Mary's, St Peter's, Victoria.

Chelmsford: Chelmer Village and Beaulieu Park, Galleywood, Goat Hall, Great Baddow East, Great Baddow West, Marconi, Moulsham and Central, Moulsham Lodge, Patching Hall, St Andrews, Springfield North, The Lawns, Trinity, Waterhouse Farm.

Clacton: Alton Park, Beaumont and Thorpe, Bockings Elm, Burrsville, Frinton, Golf Green, Hamford, Haven, Holland and Kirby, Homelands, Little Clacton and Weeley, Peter Bruff, Pier, Rush Green, St Bartholomews, St James, St Johns, St Marys, St Osyth and Point Clear, St Pauls, Walton.

Colchester: Berechurch, Castle, Christ Church, Harbour, Highwoods, Lexden, Mile End, New Town, Prettygate, St Andrew's, St Anne's, St John's, Shrub End.

Epping Forest: Broadley Common, Epping Upland and Nazeing, Buckhurst Hill East, Buckhurst Hill West, Chigwell Row, Chigwell Village, Epping Hemnall, Epping Lindsey and Thornwood Common, Grange Hill, Loughton Alderton, Loughton Broadway, Loughton Fairmead, Loughton Forest, Loughton Roding, Loughton St John's, Loughton St Mary's, Theydon Bois, Waltham Abbey High Beach, Waltham Abbey Honey Lane, Waltham Abbey North East, Waltham Abbey Paternoster, Waltham Abbey South West.

Harlow: Bush Fair, Church Langley, Great Parndon, Harlow Common, Hastingwood, Matching and Sheering Village, Little Parndon and Hare Street, Lower Nazeing, Lower Sheering, Mark Hall, Netteswell, Old Harlow, Roydon, Staple Tye, Sumners and Kingsmoor, Toddbrook.

Harwich and North Essex: Alresford, Ardleigh and Little Bromley, Bradfield, Wrabness and Wix, Brightlingsea, Dedham and Langham, East Donyland, Fordham and Stour, Great and Little Oakley, Great Bentley, Great Tey, Harwich East, Harwick East Central, Harwich West, Harwich West Central, Lawford, Manningtree, Mistley, Little Bentley and Tendring, Pyefleet, Ramsey and Parkeston, Thorrington, Frating, Elmstead and Great Bromley, West Bergholt and Eight Ash Green, West Mersea, Wivenhoe Cross, Wivenhoe Quay.

Maldon: Althorne, Bicknacre and East and West Hanningfield, Burnham-on-Crouch North, Burnham-on-Crouch South, Heybridge East, Heybridge West, Little Baddow, Danbury and Sandon, Maldon East, Maldon North, Maldon South, Maldon West, Mayland, Purleigh, Rettendon and Runwell, South Hanningfield, Stock and Margaretting, South Woodham -Chetwood and Collingwood, South Woodham - Elmwood and Woodville, Southminster, Tillingham.

Rayleigh and Wickford: Ashingdon and Canewdon, Downhall and Rawreth, Grange, Hawkwell North, Hawkwell South, Hawkwell West, Hockley Central, Hockley North, Hockley West, Hullbridge, Lodge, Rayleigh Central, Sweyne Park, Trinity, Wheatley, Whitehouse, Wickford Castledon, Wickford North, Wickford Park.

Rochford and Southend East: Barling and Sutton, Foulness and Great Wakering, Kursaal, Milton, Rochford, St Luke's, Shoeburyness, Southchurch, Thorpe, Victoria, West Shoebury.

Saffron Walden: Ashdon, Barnston and High Easter, Birchanger, Boreham and The Leighs, Broad Oak and the Hallingburys, Broomfield and The Walthams, Chelmsford Rural West, Clavering, Elsenham and Henham, Felsted, Great Dunmow North, Great Dunmow South, Hatfield Heath, Littlebury, Newport, Saffron Walden Audley, Saffron Walden Castle, Saffron Walden Shire, Stansted North, Stansted South, Stebbing, Stort Valley, Takeley and the Canfields, Thaxted, The Chesterfords, The Eastons, The Rodings, The Sampfords, Wenden Lofts, Wimbish and Debden, Writtle.

South Basildon and East Thurrock: Corringham and Fobbing, East Tilbury, Langdon Hills, Nethermayne, Orsett, Pitsea North West, Pitsea South East, Stanford East and Corringham Town, Stanford-le-Hope West, The Homesteads, Vange.

Southend West: Belfairs, Blenheim Park, Chalkwell, Eastwood Park, Leigh, Prittlewell, St Laurence, Westborough, West Leigh.

Thurrock: Aveley and Uplands, Belhus, Chadwell St Mary, Chafford and North Stifford, Grays Riverside, Grays Thurrock, Little Thurrock Blackshots, Little Thurrock Rectory, Ockendon, South Chafford, Stifford Clays, Tilbury Riverside and Thurrock Park, Tilbury St Chads, West Thurrock and South Stifford.

Witham: Black Notley and Terling, Birch and Winstree, Bradwell, Silver End and Rivenhall, Coggeshall and North Feering, Copford and West Stanway, Great Totham, Hatfield Peverel, Kelvedon, Marks Tey, Stanway, Tiptree, Tollesbury, Tolleshunt D’Arcy, Wickham Bishops and Woodham, Witham Chipping Hill and Central, Witham North, Witham South, Witham West.

Gloucestershire
Cheltenham: All Saints, Battledown, Benhall and The Reddings, Charlton Kings, Charlton Park, college, Hesters Way, Lansdown, Leckhampton, Oakley, Park, Pittville, St Mark's, St Paul's, St Peter's, Springbank, Up Hatherley, Warden Hill.

Forest of Dean: Alvington, Aylburton and West Lydney, Awre, Berry Hill, Blaisdon and Longhope, Bream, Bromesberrow and Dymock, Christchurch and English Bicknor, Churcham and Huntley, Cinderford East, Cinderford West, Coleford Central, Coleford East, Hartpury, Hewelsfield and Woolaston, Highnam with Haw Bridge, Littledean and Ruspidge, Lydbrook and Ruardean, Lydney East, Lydney North, Mitcheldean and Drybrook, Newent Central, Newland and St Briavels, Newnham and Westbury, Oxenhall and Newent North East, Pillowell, Redmarley, Tibberton, Tidenham.

Gloucester: Abbey, Barnwood, Barton and Tredworth, Elmbridge, Grange, Hucclecote, Kingsholm and Wotton, Matson and Robinswood, Moreland, Podsmead, Quedgeley Fieldcourt, Quedgeley Severn Vale, Tuffley, Westgate.

Stroud: Amberley and Woodchester, Berkeley, Bisley, Cainscross, Cam East, Cam West, Central, Chalford, Coaley and Uley, Dursley, Eastington and Standish, Farmhill and Paganhill, Hardwicke, Nailsworth, Over Stroud, Painswick, Rodborough, Severn, Slade, Stonehouse, The Stanleys, Thrupp, Trinity, Uplands, Upton St Leonards, Vale, Valley.

Tewkesbury: Ashchurch with Walton Cardiff, Badgeworth, Brockworth, Churchdown Brookfield, Churchdown St John's, Cleeve Grange, Cleeve Hill, Cleeve St Michael's, Cleeve West, Coombe Hill, Hucclecote, Innsworth with Down Hatherley, Isbourne, Longlevens, Northway, Oxenton Hill, Prestbury, Shurdington, Swindon Village, Tewkesbury Newtown, Tewkesbury Prior's Park, Tewkesbury Town With Mitton, Twyning, Winchcombe.

The Cotswolds: Ampney-Coln, Avening, Beacon-Stow, Blockley, Bourton-on-the-Water, Campden-Vale, Chedworth, Churn Valley, Cirencester Beeches, Cirencester Chesterton, Cirencester Park, Cirencester Stratton-Whiteway, Cirencester Watermoor, Ermin, Fairford, Fosseridge, Grumbolds Ash, Hampton, Kempsford-Lechlade, Kingswood, Minchinhampton, Moreton-in-Marsh, Northleach, Rissingtons, Riversmeet, Sandywell, Tetbury, Thames Head, Three Rivers, Water Park.

See: South Gloucestershire for Filton and Bradley Stoke, Kingswood & Thornbury and Yate constituencies.

Hampshire and Southampton
Aldershot: Blackwater and Hawley, Cove and Southwood, Empress, Fernhill, Frogmore and Darby Green, Grange, Heron Wood, Knellwood, Manor Park, Mayfield, North Town, Rowhill, St. John's, St. Mark's, Wellington, Westheath.

Basingstoke: Basing, Brighton Hill North, Brighton Hill South, Brookvale and Kings Furlong, Buckskin, Chineham, Eastrop, Grove, Hatch Warren and Beggarwood, Kempshott, Norden, Popley East, Popley West, Rooksdown, South Ham, Winklebury.

East Hampshire: Alton Amery, Alton Ashdell, Alton Eastbrooke, Alton Westbrooke, Alton Whitedown, Alton Wooteys, Binstead and Bentley, Bramshott and Liphook, Downland, East Meon, Four Marks and Medstead, Froxfield and Steep, Grayshott, Headley, Holybourne and Froyle, Lindford, Liss, Petersfield Bell Hill, Petersfield Causeway, Petersfield Heath, Petersfield Rother, Petersfield St Marys, Petersfield St Peters, Ropley and Tisted, Selborne, The Hangers and Forest, Whitehill Chase, Whitehill Deadwater, Whitehill Hogmoor, Whitehill Pinewood, Whitehill Walldown.

Eastleigh: Bishopstoke East, Bishopstoke West, Botley, Bursledon and Old Netley, Eastleigh Central, Eastleigh North, Eastleigh South, Fair Oak and Horton Heath, Hamble-le-Rice and Butlocks Heath, Hedge End Grange Park, Hedge End St John's, Hedge End Wildern, Netley Abbey, West End North, West End South.

Fareham: Fareham East, Fareham North, Fareham North-West, Fareham South, Fareham West, Locks Heath, Park Gate, Portchester East, Portchester West, Sarisbury, Titchfield, Titchfield Common, Warsash.

Gosport: Alverstoke, Anglesey, Bridgemary North, Bridgemary South, Brockhurst, Christchurch, Elson, Forton, Grange, Hardway, Hill Head, Lee East, Lee West, Leesland, Peel Common, Privett, Rowner and Holbrook, Stubbington, Town.

Havant: Barncroft, Battins, Bedhampton, Bondfields, Emsworth, Hayling East, Hayling West, Purbrook, St Faith's, Stakes, Warren Park.

Meon Valley: Bishops Waltham, Boarhunt and Southwick, Cheriton and Bishops Sutton, Clanfield and Finchdean, Cowplain, Denmead, Droxford, Soberton and Hambledon, Hart Plain, Horndean Catherington and Lovedean, Horndean Downs, Horndean Hazleton and Blendworth, Horndean Kings, Horndean Murray, Owslebury and Curdridge, Rowlands Castle, Shedfield, Swanmore and Newtown, Upper Meon Valley, Waterloo, Whiteley, Wickham.

New Forest East: Ashurst, Copythorne South and Netley Marsh, Boldre and Sway, Bramshaw, Copythorne North and Minstead, Brockenhurst and Forest South East, Butts Ash and Dibden Purlieu, Dibden and Hythe East, Fawley, Blackfield and Langley, Furzedown and Hardley, Holbury and North Blackfield, Hythe West and Langdown, Lyndhurst, Marchwood, Totton Central, Totton East, Totton North, Totton South, Totton West.

New Forest West: Barton, Bashley, Becton, Bransgore and Burley, Buckland, Downlands and Forest, Fernhill, Fordingbridge, Forest North West, Hordle, Lymington Town, Milford, Milton, Pennington, Ringwood East and Sopley, Ringwood North, Ringwood South.

North East Hampshire: Calleva, Church Crookham East, Church Crookham West, Crondall, Eversley, Fleet Central, Fleet Courtmoor, Fleet North, Fleet Pondtail, Fleet West, Hartley Wintney, Hook, Long Sutton, Odiham, Pamber, Sherborne St John, Upton Grey and The Candovers, Yateley East, Yateley North, Yateley West.

North West Hampshire: Alamein, Amport, Anna, Baughurst, Burghclere, Bourne Valley, Charlton, East Woodhay, Harroway, Highclere and Bourne, Kingsclere, Millway, Oakley and North Waltham, Overton, Laverstoke and Steventon, Penton Bellinger, St Mary's, Tadley North, Tadley South, Whitchurch, Winton.

Romsey and Southampton North: Abbey, Ampfield and Braishfield, Bassett, Blackwater, Broughton and Stockbridge, Chilworth, Nursling and Rownhams, Cupernham, Dun Valley, Harewood, Kings Somborne and Michelmersh, North Baddesley, Over Wallop, Romsey Extra, Swaythling, Tadburn, Valley Park.

Southampton, Itchen: Bargate, Bitterne, Bitterne Park, Harefield, Peartree, Sholing, Woolston.

Southampton, Test: Bevois, Coxford, Freemantle, Millbrook, Portswood, Redbridge, Shirley.

Winchester: Chandler's Ford East, Chandler's Ford West, Colden Common and Twyford, Compton and Otterbourne, Hiltingbury East, Hiltingbury West, Itchen Valley, Kings Worthy, Littleton and Harestock, Olivers Battery and Badger Farm, St Barnabas, St Bartholomew, St John and All Saints, St Luke, St Michael, St Paul, Sparsholt, The Alresfords, Wonston and Micheldever.

See: Portsmouth for Portsmouth North and South constituencies.

Hartlepool
Hartlepool: Brus, Burn Valley, Dyke House, Elwick, Fens, Foggy Furze, Grange, Greatham, Hart, Owton, Park, Rift House, Rossmere, St Hilda, Seaton, Stranton, Throston.

See: Durham and Darlington for Bishop Auckland, City of Durham, Darlington, Easington, North Durham, North West Durham & Sedgefield constituencies.

Herefordshire
Hereford and South Herefordshire: Aylestone, Belmont, Central, Golden Valley North, Golden Valley South, Hollington, Kerne Bridge, Llangarron, Penyard, Pontrilas, Ross-on-Wye East, Ross-on-Wye West, St Martins and Hinton, St Nicholas, Stoney Street, Three Elms, Tupsley, Valletts.

North Herefordshire: Backbury, Bircher, Bringsty, Bromyard, Burghill, Holmer and Lyde, Castle, Credenhill, Frome, Golden Cross with Weobley, Hagley, Hampton Court, Hope End, Kington Town, Ledbury, Leominster North, Leominster South, Mortimer, Old Gore, Pembridge and Lyonshall with Titley, Sutton Walls, Upton, Wormsley Ridge.

Hertfordshire
Broxbourne: Broxbourne, Bury Green, Cheshunt Central, Cheshunt North, Flamstead End, Goffs Oak, Hoddesdon North, Hoddesdon Town, Northaw, Rosedale, Rye Park, Theobalds, Waltham Cross, Wormley & Turnford.

Hemel Hempstead: Adeyfield East, Adeyfield West, Apsley, Ashridge, Bennetts End, Boxmoor, Chaulden & Shrubhill, Corner Hall, Gadebridge, Grove Hill, Hemel Hempstead Central, Highfield & St Pauls, Kings Langley, Leverstock Green, Nash Mills, Warners End, Watling, Woodhall.

Hertford and Stortford: Bishop's Stortford All Saints, Bishop's Stortford Central, Bishop's Stortford Meads, Bishop's Stortford Silverleys,
Bishop's Stortford South, Great Amwell, Hertford Bengeo, Hertford Castle, Hertford Heath, Hertford Kingsmead, Hertford Sele, Hunsdon, Much Hadham, Sawbridgeworth, Stanstead Abbots, Ware Chadwell, Ware Christchurch, Ware St Mary's, Ware Trinity.

Hertsmere: Aldenham East, Aldenham West, Borehamwood Brookmeadow, Borehamwood Cowley Hill, Borehamwood Hillside, Borehamwood Kenilworth, Bushey Heath, Bushey North, Bushey Park, Bushey St James, Elstree, Potters Bar Furzefield, Potters Bar Oakmere, Potters Bar Parkfield, Shenley.

Hitchin and Harpenden: Cadwell, Graveley & Wymondley, Harpenden East, Harpenden North, Harpenden South, Harpenden West, Hitchin Bearton, Hitchin Highbury, Hitchin Oughton, Hitchin Priory, Hitchin Walsworth, Hitchwood, Hoo, Kimpton, Offa, Redbourn, Sandridge, Wheathampstead.

North East Hertfordshire: Arbury, Baldock East, Baldock Town, Braughing, Buntingford, Hertford Rural North, Hertford Rural South, Ermine, Letchworth East, Letchworth Grange, Letchworth South East, Letchworth South West, Letchworth Wilbury, Little Hadham, Mundens and Cottered, Puckeridge, Royston Heath, Royston Meridian,
Royston Palace, Thundridge & Standon, Walkern, Watton-at-Stone, Weston and Sandon.

South West Hertfordshire: Aldbury and Wigginton, Ashridge, Berkhamsted Castle, Berkhamsted East, Berkhamsted West, Bovingdon, Chorleywood East, Chorleywood West, Croxley Green, Croxley Green North, Croxley Green South, Flaunden & Chipperfield, Hayling, Maple Cross & Mill End, Moor Park & Eastbury, Northchurch, Northwick, Penn, Rickmansworth, Rickmansworth West, Sarratt, Tring Central, Tring East, Tring West.

St Albans: Ashley, Batchwood, Bedmond & Primrose Hill, Clarence, Colney Heath, Cunningham, London Colney, Marshalswick North, Marshalswick South, Park Street, St Peters, St Stephen, Sopwell, Verulam.

Stevenage: Bandley Hill, Bedwell, Chells, Codicote, Datchworth and Aston, Knebworth, Longmeadow, Manor, Martins Wood, Old Town, Pin Green, Roebuck, St Nicholas, Shephall, Symonds Green, Woodfield.

Watford: Abbots Langley, Callowland, Carpenders Park, Central, Holywell, Langleybury, Leavesden, Leggatts, Meriden, Nascot, Oxhey, Oxhey Hall, Park, Stanborough, Tudor, Vicarage, Woodside.

Welwyn Hatfield: Brookmans Park and Little Heath, Haldens, Handside, Hatfield Central, Hatfield East, Hatfield North, Hatfield South, Hatfield West, Hollybush, Howlands, Panshanger, Peartree, Sherrards, Welham Green, Welwyn North, Welwyn South.

Isle of Wight
Isle of Wight: Ashey, Bembridge North, Bembridge South, Binstead, Brading and St Helens, Brighstone and Calbourne, Carisbrooke East, Carisbrooke West, Central Rural, Chale, Niton and Whitwell, Cowes Castle East, Cowes Castle West, Cowes Central,
Cowes Medina, East Cowes North, East Cowes South, Fairlee, Freshwater Afton, Freshwater Norton, Gurnard, Lake North, Lake South, Mount Joy, Newchurch, Newport North, Newport South, Northwood, Osborne, Pan, Parkhurst, Ryde North East, Ryde North West, Ryde South East, Ryde South West, St Johns East, St Johns West, Sandown North, Sandown South, Seaview and Nettlestone, Shalfleet and Yarmouth, Shanklin Central, Shanklin North, Shanklin South, Totland, Ventnor East, Ventnor West, Wootton, Wroxall and Godshill.

Kent and Medway
Ashford: Aylesford Green, Beaver, Biddenden, Bockhanger, Boughton Aluph and Eastwell, Bybrook, Charing, Downs North, Downs West, Godinton, Great Chart with Singleton North, Highfield, Isle of Oxney, Kennington, Little Burton Farm, Norman, North Willesborough, Park Farm North, Park Farm South, Rolvenden and Tenterden West, St Michaels, Singleton South, South Willesborough, Stanhope, Stour, Tenterden North, Tenterden South, Victoria, Washford, Weald Central, Weald East, Weald North, Weald South, Wye.

Canterbury: Barham Downs, Barton, Blean Forest, Chartham and Stone Street, Chestfield and Swalecliffe, Gorrell, Harbledown, Harbour, Little Stour, North Nailbourne, Northgate, St Stephens, Seasalter, Sturry North, Sturry South, Tankerton, Westgate, Wincheap.

Chatham and Aylesford: Aylesford, Blue Bell Hill and Walderslade, Burham, Chatham Central, Eccles and Wouldham, Ditton, Larkfield North, Larkfield South, Lordswood and Capstone, Luton and Wayfield, Princes Park, Snodland East, Snodland West, Walderslade.

Dartford: Bean and Darenth, Brent, Castle, Greenhithe, Hartley and Hodsoll Street, Heath, Joyce Green, Joydens Wood, Littlebrook, Longfield, New Barn and Southfleet, Newtown, Princes, Stone, Sutton-at-Hone and Hawley, Swanscombe, Town, West Hill, Wilmington.

Dover: Aylesham, Buckland, Capel-le-Ferne, Castle, Eastry, Eythorne and Shepherdswell, Lydden and Temple Ewell, Maxton, Elms Vale and Priory, Middle Deal and Sholden, Mill Hill, North Deal, Ringwould, River, St Margaret's-at-Cliffe, St Radigunds, Tower Hamlets, Town and Pier, Walmer, Whitfield.

Faversham and Mid Kent: Abbey, Bearsted, Boughton, Monchelsea and Chart Sutton, Boxley, Courtenay, Davington Priory, Detling and Thurnham, Downswood and Otham, East Downs, Harrietsham and Lenham, Headcorn, Leeds, North Downs, Park Wood, Shepway North, Shepway South, St Ann's, Sutton Valence and Langley, Watling.

Folkestone and Hythe: Dymchurch and St Mary's Bay, Elham and Stelling Minnis, Folkestone Cheriton, Folkestone East, Folkestone Foord, Folkestone Harbour, Folkestone Harvey Central, Folkestone Harvey West, Folkestone Morehall, Folkestone Park, Folkestone Sandgate, Hythe Central, Hythe East, Hythe West, Lydd, Lympne and Stanford, New Romney Coast, New Romney Town, North Downs East, North Downs West, Romney Marsh, Saxon Shore, Tolsford.

Gillingham and Rainham: Gillingham North, Gillingham South, Hempstead and Wigmore, Rainham Central, Rainham North, Rainham South, Twydall, Watling.

Gravesham: Central, Chalk, Coldharbour, Higham, Istead Rise, Meopham North, Meopham South and Vigo, Northfleet North, Northfleet South, Painters Ash, Pelham, Riverside, Riverview, Shorne, Cobham and Luddesdown, Singlewell, Westcourt, Whitehill, Woodlands.

Maidstone and The Weald: Allington, Barming, Benenden and Cranbrook, Bridge, Coxheath and Hunton, East, Fant, Frittenden and Sissinghurst, Heath, High Street, Loose, Marden and Yalding, North, South, Staplehurst.

North Thanet: Birchington North, Birchington South, Dane Valley, Garlinge, Greenhill and Eddington, Herne and Broomfield, Heron, Margate Central, Marshside, Reculver, Salmestone, Thanet Villages, West Bay, Westbrook, Westgate-on-Sea.

Rochester and Strood: Cuxton and Halling, Peninsula, River, Rochester East, Rochester South and Horsted, Rochester West, Strood North, Strood Rural, Strood South.

Sevenoaks: Ash, Brasted, Chevening and Sundridge, Crockenhill and Well Hill, Dunton Green and Riverhead, Eynsford, Farningham, Horton Kirby and South Darenth, Fawkham and West Kingsdown, Halstead, Knockholt and Badgers Mount, Hextable, Kemsing, Otford and Shoreham, Seal and Weald, Sevenoaks Eastern, Sevenoaks Kippington, Sevenoaks Northern, Sevenoaks Town and St John's, Swanley Christchurch and Swanley Village, Swanley St Mary's, Swanley White Oak, Westerham and Crockham Hill.

Sittingbourne and Sheppey: Borden, Chalkwell, Grove, Hartlip, Newington and Upchurch, Iwade and Lower Halstow, Kemsley, Leysdown and Warden, Milton Regis, Minster Cliffs, Murston, Queenborough and Halfway, Roman, St Michaels, Sheerness East, Sheerness West, Sheppey Central, Teynham and Lynsted, West Downs, Woodstock.

South Thanet: Beacon Road, Bradstowe, Central Harbour, Cliffsend and Pegwell, Cliftonville East, Cliftonville West, Eastcliff, Kingsgate, Little Stour and Ashstone, Nethercourt, Newington, Northwood, Sandwich, St Peters, Sir Moses Montefiore, Viking.

Tonbridge and Malling: Borough Green and Long Mill, Cage Green, Castle, Cowden and Hever, Downs, East Malling, East Peckham and Golden Green, Edenbridge North and East, Edenbridge South and West, Hadlow, Leigh and Chiddingstone Causeway, Mereworth and West Peckham, Higham, Hildenborough, Ightham, Judd, Kings Hill, Medway, Trench, Vauxhall, Wateringbury, West Malling and Leybourne, Wrotham.

Tunbridge Wells: Brenchley and Horsmonden, Broadwater, Capel, Culverden, Goudhurst and Lamberhurst, Hawkhurst and Sandhurst, Paddock Wood East, Paddock Wood West, Pantiles and St Mark's, Park, Pembury, Rusthall, St James’, St John's, Sherwood, Southborough and High Brooms, Southborough North, Speldhurst and Bidborough.

Lancashire, Blackburn with Darwen and Blackpool
Blackburn: Audley, Bastwell, Beardwood with Lammack, Corporation Park, Ewood, Higher Croft, Little Harwood, Livesey with Pleasington, Meadowhead, Mill Hill, Queen's Park, Roe Lee, Shadsworth with Whitebirk, Shear Brow, Wensley Fold.

Blackpool North and Cleveleys: Anchorsholme, Bispham, Bourne, Claremont, Cleveleys Park, Greenlands, Ingthorpe, Jubilee, Layton, Norbreck, Park, Victoria, Warbreck.

Blackpool South: Bloomfield, Brunswick, Clifton, Hawes Side, Highfield, Marton, Squires Gate, Stanley, Talbot, Tyldesley, Victoria, Waterloo.

Burnley: Bank Hall, Briercliffe, Brunshaw, Cliviger with Worsthorne, Coal Clough with Deerplay, Daneshouse with Stoneyholme, Gannow, Gawthorpe, Hapton with Park, Lanehead, Queensgate, Rosegrove with Lowerhouse, Rosehill with Burnley Wood, Trinity, Whittlefield with Ightenhill.

Chorley: Adlington and Anderton, Astley and Buckshaw, Brindle and Hoghton, Chisnall, Chorley East, Chorley North East, Chorley North West, Chorley South East, Chorley South West, Clayton-le-Woods and Whittle-le-Woods, Clayton-le-Woods North,
Clayton-le-Woods West and Cuerden, Coppull, Euxton North, Euxton South, Heath Charnock and Rivington, Pennine, Wheelton and Withnell.

Fylde: Ansdell, Ashton, Central, Clifton, Elswick and Little Eccleston, Fairhaven, Freckleton East, Freckleton West, Heyhouses, Kilnhouse, Kirkham North, Kirkham South, Lea, Medlar-with-Wesham, Newton and Treales, Park, Ribby-with-Wrea, St Johns, St Leonards, Singleton and Greenhalgh, Staining and Weeton, Warton and Westby.

Hyndburn: Altham, Barnfield, Baxenden, Central, Church, Clayton-le-Moors, Greenfield, Huncoat, Immanuel, Milnshaw, Netherton, Overton, Peel, Rishton, St Andrew's, St Oswald's, Spring Hill, Worsley.

Lancaster and Fleetwood: Bulk, Castle, Duke's, Ellel, John O’Gaunt, Lower Lune Valley, Mount, Park, Pharos, Pilling, Preesall, Rossall, Scotforth East, Scotforth West, university, Warren, Wyresdale.

Morecambe and Lunesdale: Bare, Bolton-le-Sands, Carnforth, Halton-with-Aughton, Harbour, Heysham Central, Heysham North, Heysham South, Kellet, Overton, Poulton, Silverdale, Skerton East, Skerton West, Slyne-with-Hest, Torrisholme, Upper Lune Valley, Warton, Westgate.

Pendle: Barrowford, Blacko and Higherford, Boulsworth, Bradley, Brierfield, Clover Hill, Coates, Craven, Earby, Foulridge, Higham and Pendleside, Horsfield, Marsden, Old Laund Booth, Reedley, Southfield, Vivary Bridge, Walverden, Waterside, Whitefield.

Preston: Ashton, Brookfield, Deepdale, Fishwick, Ingol, Larches, Moor Park, Ribbleton, Riversway, St George's, St Matthew's, Town Centre, Tulketh, university.

Ribble Valley: Aighton, Bailey and Chaigley, Alston and Hothersall, Bamber Bridge East, Bamber Bridge North, Bamber Bridge West, Billington and Old Langho, Bowland, Newton and Slaidburn, Chatburn, Chipping, Clayton-le-Dale with Ramsgreave, Coupe Green and Gregson Lane, Derby and Thornley, Dilworth, Edisford and Low Moor, Farington East, Farington West, Gisburn, Rimington, Langho, Littlemoor, Lostock Hall, Mellor, Primrose, Read and Simonstone, Ribchester, Sabden, St Mary's, Salthill, Samlesbury and Walton, Tardy Gate, Waddington and West Bradford, Walton-le-Dale, Whalley, Wilpshire, Wiswell and Pendleton.

Rossendale and Darwen: Cribden, Earcroft, East Rural, Eden, Facit and Shawforth, Fernhurst, Goodshaw, Greensclough, Hareholme, Healey and Whitworth, Helmshore, Irwell, Longholme, Marsh House, North Turton with Tockholes, Stacksteads, Sudell, Sunnyhurst, Whitehall, Whitewell.

South Ribble: Broad Oak, Charnock, Earnshaw Bridge, Eccleston and Mawdesley, Golden Hill, Hesketh-with-Becconsall, Howick and Priory, Kingsfold, Leyland Central, Leyland St Ambrose, Leyland St Mary's, Little Hoole and Much Hoole, Longton and Hutton West, Lostock, Lowerhouse, Middleforth, Moss Side, New Longton and Hutton East, North Meols, Rufford, Seven Stars, Tarleton, Whitefield.

West Lancashire: Ashurst, Aughton and Downholland, Aughton Park, Bickerstaffe, Birch Green, Burscough East, Burscough West, Derby, Digmoor, Halsall, Knowsley, Moorside, Newburgh, Parbold, Scarisbrick, Scott, Skelmersdale North, Skelmersdale South, Tanhouse, Up Holland, Wrightington.

Wyre and Preston North: Breck, Brock, Cabus, Cadley, Calder, Carleton, Catterall, college, Garrison, Garstang, Great Eccleston, Greyfriars, Hambleton and Stalmine-with-Staynall, Hardhorn, High Cross, Norcross, Preston Rural East, Preston Rural North, Sharoe Green, Staina, Tithebarn.

Leicester
Leicester East: Belgrave, Charnwood, Coleman, Evington, Humberstone and Hamilton, Latimer, Rushey Mead, Thurncourt.

Leicester South: Aylestone, Castle, Eyres Monsell, Freemen, Knighton, Spinney Hills, Stoneygate.

Leicester West: Abbey, Beaumont Leys, Braunstone Park and Rowley Fields, Fosse, New Parks, Westcotes, Western Park.

See: Leicestershire and Rutland for Bosworth, Charnwood, Harborough, Loughborough, North West Leicestershire, Rutland and Melton & South Leicestershire constituencies.

Leicestershire and Rutland
Bosworth: Ambien, Barlestone, Nailstone and Osbaston, Barwell, Burbage, St Catherines and Lash Hill, Burbage, Sketchley and Stretton, Cadeby, Carlton and Market Bosworth with Shackerstone, Earl Shilton, Hinckley Castle, Hinckley Clarendon, Hinckley De Montfort, Hinckley Trinity, Markfield, Stanton and Fieldhead, Newbold Verdon with Desford and Peckleton, Ratby, Bagworth and Thornton, Twycross and Witherley with Sheepy.

Charnwood: Anstey, Birstall Wanlip, Birstall Watermead, East Goscote, Ellis, Fairestone, Forest, Forest Bradgate, Groby, Mountsorrel, Muxloe, Queniborough, Rothley and Thurcaston, Syston East, Syston West, Thurmaston, Wreake Villages.

Harborough: Bosworth, Fleckney, Glen, Kibworth, Lubenham, Market Harborough-Great Bowden and Arden, Market Harborough-Little Bowden, Market Harborough-Logan, Market Harborough-Welland, Oadby Brocks Hill, Oadby Grange, Oadby St Peter's, Oadby Uplands, Oadby Woodlands, South Wigston, Wigston All Saints, Wigston Fields, Wigston Meadowcourt, Wigston St Wolstan's.

Loughborough: Barrow and Sileby West, Loughborough Ashby, Loughborough Dishley and Hathern, Loughborough Garendon, Loughborough Hastings, Loughborough Lemyngton, Loughborough Nanpantan, Loughborough Outwoods, Loughborough Shelthorpe, Loughborough Southfields, Loughborough Storer, Quorn and Mountsorrel Castle, Shepshed East, Shepshed West, Sileby, The Wolds.

North West Leicestershire: Appleby, Ashby Castle, Ashby Holywell, Ashby Ivanhoe, Bardon, Breedon, Castle Donington, Coalville, Greenhill, Hugglescote, Ibstock and Heather, Kegworth and Whatton, Measham, Moira, Oakthorpe and Donisthorpe, Ravenstone and Packington, Snibston, Thringstone, Valley, Whitwick.

Rutland and Melton: Asfordby, Bottesford, Braunston and Belton, Cottesmore, Croxton Kerrial, Exton, Frisby-on-the-Wreake, Gaddesby, Greetham, Ketton, Langham, Long Clawson and Stathern, Lyddington, Martinsthorpe, Melton Craven, Melton Dorian, Melton Egerton, Melton Newport, Melton Sysonby, Melton Warwick, Normanton, Oakham North East, Oakham North West, Oakham South East, Oakham South West, Old Dalby, Ryhall and Casterton, Somerby, Uppingham, Waltham-on-the-Wolds, Whissendine, Wymondham.

South Leicestershire: Blaby South, Broughton Astley-Astley, Broughton Astley-Broughton, Broughton Astley-Primethorpe, Broughton Astley-Sutton, Cosby with South Whetstone, Countesthorpe, Croft Hill, Dunton, Enderby and St John's, Lutterworth Brookfield, Lutterworth Orchard, Lutterworth Springs, Lutterworth Swift, Millfield, Misterton, Narborough and Littlethorpe, Normanton, North Whetstone, Pastures, Peatling, Ravenhurst and Fosse, Saxondale, Stanton and Flamville, Ullesthorpe, Winstanley.

See: Leicester for Leicester East, South & West constituencies.

Lincolnshire
Boston and Skegness: Burgh le Marsh, Central, Coastal, Croft, Fenside, Fishtoft, Five Village, Frampton and Holme, Frithville, Ingoldmells, Kirton, North, Old Leake and Wrangle, Pilgrim, St Clement's, Scarbrough, Seacroft, Sibsey, Skirbeck, South, Staniland North, Staniland South, Stickney, Swineshead and Holland Fen, Wainfleet and Friskney, West, Winthorpe, Witham, Wyberton.

Gainsborough: Bardney, Caistor, Cherry Willingham, Dunholme, Fiskerton, Gainsborough East, Gainsborough North, Gainsborough South-West, Hemswell, Kelsey, Lea, Market Rasen, Middle Rasen, Nettleham, Saxilby, Scampton, Scotter, Stow, Sudbrooke, Thonock, Torksey, Waddingham and Spital, Welton, Wold View, Wragby, Yarborough.

Grantham and Stamford: All Saints, Aveland, Belmont, Bourne East, Bourne West, Earlesfield, Forest, Glen Eden, Grantham St John's, Green Hill, Greyfriars, Harrowby, Hillsides, Isaac Newton, Lincrest, Morkery, Ringstone, St Anne's, St George's, St Mary's, St Wulfram's, Stamford St John's, Thurlby, Toller, Truesdale.

Lincoln: Abbey, Birchwood, Boultham, Bracebridge, Bracebridge Heath and Waddington East, Carholme, Castle, Glebe, Hartsholme, Minster, Moorland, Park, Skellingthorpe.

Louth and Horncastle: Alford, Binbrook, Chapel St Leonards, Coningsby and Tattershall, Grimoldby, Halton Holegate, Holton le Clay, Horncastle, Hundleby, Legbourne, Ludford, Mablethorpe Central, Mablethorpe East, Mablethorpe North, Mareham le Fen, Marshchapel, North Holme, North Somercotes, North Thoresby, Priory, Roughton, St James’, St Margaret's, St Mary's, St Michael's, Skidbrooke with Saltfleet Haven, Spilsby,
Sutton on Sea North, Sutton on Sea South, Tetford, Tetney, Trinity, Trusthorpe and Mablethorpe South, Willoughby with Sloothby, Withern with Stain, Woodhall Spa.

Sleaford and North Hykeham: Ashby de la Launde, Barrowby, Bassingham, Billinghay, Branston and Mere, Brant Broughton, Cliff Villages, Cranwell and Byard's Leap, Eagle and North Scarle, Ermine, Heath, Heckington Rural, Heighington and Washingborough, Kyme, Leasingham and Roxholm, Loveden, Martin, Metheringham, North Hykeham Forum, North Hykeham Memorial, North Hykeham Mill, North Hykeham Moor, North Hykeham Witham, Osbournby, Peascliffe, Ruskington, Saxonwell, Sleaford Castle, Sleaford Holdingham, Sleaford Mareham, Sleaford Navigation, Sleaford Quarrington, Sleaford Westholme, Waddington West, Witham Valley.

South Holland and The Deepings: Crowland, Deeping St James, Deeping St Nicholas, Donington, Fleet, Gedney, Gosberton Village, Holbeach Hurn, Holbeach St John's, Holbeach Town, Long Sutton, Market and West Deeping, Pinchbeck, Spalding Castle, Spalding Monks House, Spalding St John's, Spalding St Mary's, Spalding St Paul's, Spalding Wygate, Surfleet, Sutton Bridge, The Saints, Weston and Moulton, Whaplode.

See: East Riding of Yorkshire, Kingston upon Hull and North and North East Lincolnshire for Brigg and Goole, Cleethorpes, Great Grimsby & Scunthorpe constituencies.

Middlesbrough and Redcar and Cleveland
Middlesbrough: Acklam, Ayresome, Beckfield, Beechwood, Brookfield, Clairville, Gresham, Kader, Linthorpe, Middlehaven, North Ormesby and Brambles Farm, Pallister, Park, Thorntree, university.

Middlesbrough South and East Cleveland: Brotton, Coulby Newham, Guisborough, Hemlington, Hutton, Ladgate, Lockwood, Loftus, Marton, Marton West, Nunthorpe, Park End, Saltburn, Skelton, Stainton and Thornton, Westworth.

Redcar: Coatham, Dormanstown, Eston, Grangetown, Kirkleatham, Longbeck, Newcomen, Normanby, Ormesby, St Germain's, South Bank, Teesville, West Dyke, Zetland.

See: North Yorkshire for Harrogate and Knaresborough, Richmond, Scarborough and Whitby, Selby and Ainsty, Skipton and Ripon  & Thirsk and Malton constituencies.

Milton Keynes
Milton Keynes North: Bradwell, Campbell Park, Hanslope Park, Linford North, Linford South, Middleton, Newport Pagnell North, Newport Pagnell South, Olney, Sherington, Stantonbury, Wolverton.

Milton Keynes South: Bletchley and Fenny Stratford, Danesborough, Denbigh, Eaton Manor, Emerson Valley, Furzton, Loughton Park, Stony Stratford, Walton Park, Whaddon, Woughton.

See: Buckinghamshire for Aylesbury, Beaconsfield, Buckingham, Chesham and Amersham & Wycombe constituencies.

Norfolk
Broadland: Acle, Astley, Aylsham, Blofield with South Walsham, Brundall, Burlingham, Buxton, Coltishall, Drayton North, Drayton South, Eynesford, Great Witchingham, Hevingham, Horsford and Felthorpe, Lancaster North, Lancaster South, Marshes, Plumstead, Reepham, Spixworth with St Faiths, Taverham North, Taverham South, The Raynhams, Walsingham, Wensum, Wroxham.

Great Yarmouth: Bradwell North, Bradwell South and Hopton, Caister North, Caister South, Central and Northgate, Claydon, East Flegg, Fleggburgh, Gorleston, Lothingland, Magdalen, Nelson, Ormesby, St Andrews, Southtown and Cobholm, West Flegg,
Yarmouth North.

Mid Norfolk: Abbey, All Saints, Buckenham, Burgh and Haverscroft, Cromwells, Dereham-Central, Dereham-Humbletoft, Dereham-Neatherd, Dereham-Toftwood, Eynsford, Haggard De Toni, Hermitage, Hingham and Deopham, Launditch, Necton, Northfields, Queen's, Rustens, Shipdham, Springvale and Scarning, Swanton Morley, Taverner, Templar, Town, Two Rivers, Upper Wensum, Upper Yare, Watton, Wicklewood, Wissey.

North Norfolk: Briston, Chaucer, Corpusty, Cromer Town, Erpingham, Glaven Valley, Gaunt, Happisburgh, High Heath, Holt, Hoveton, Mundesley, North Walsham East, North Walsham North, North Walsham West, Poppyland, Priory, Roughton, Scottow,
St Benet, Sheringham North, Sheringham South, Stalham and Sutton, Suffield Park, The Runtons, Waterside, Waxham, Worstead.

North West Norfolk: Brancaster, Burnham, Clenchwarton, Dersingham, Docking, Fairstead, Gayton, Gaywood Chase, Gaywood North Bank, Grimston, Heacham, Hunstanton, North Lynn, North Wootton, Old Gaywood, Priory, Rudham St Margarets with St Nicholas, Snettisham, South and West Lynn, South Wootton, Spellowfields, Springwood, Valley Hill, Walpole, West Winch.

Norwich North: Catton Grove, Crome, Hellesdon North West, Hellesdon South East, Mile Cross, Old Catton and Sprowston West, Sewell, Sprowston Central, Sprowston East, Thorpe St Andrew North West, Thorpe St Andrew South East.

Norwich South: Bowthorpe, Eaton, Lakenham, Mancroft, Nelson, New Costessey, Thorpe Hamlet, Town Close, university, Wensum.

South Norfolk: Beck Vale, Bressingham and Burston, Brooke, Bunwell, Chedgrave and Thurton, Cringleford, Dickleburgh, Diss, Ditchingham and Broome, Earsham, Easton, Forncett, Gillingham, Harleston, Hempnall, Hethersett, Loddon, Mulbarton, Newton Flotman, Old Costessey, Poringland with The Framinghams, Rockland, Roydon, Scole, Stoke Holy Cross, Stratton, Tasburgh, Thurlton.

South West Norfolk: Airfield, Conifer, Denton, Downham Old Town, East Downham, East Guiltcross, Emneth with Outwell, Harling and Heathlands, Hilgay with Denver, Mershe Lande,  Mid Forest, Nar Valley, North Downham, St Lawrence, South Downham, Swaffham, Thetford-Abbey, Thetford-Castle, Thetford-Guildhall, Thetford-Saxon, Upwell and Delph, Walton, Watlington, Wayland, Weeting, Wiggenhall, Wimbotsham with Fincham Wissey.

Northamptonshire
Corby: Barnwell, Central, Danesholme, Dryden, East, Fineshade, Hazelwood, Hillside, Irthlingborough, King's Forest, Kingswood, Lloyds, Lodge Park, Lower Nene, Lyveden, Oundle, Prebendal, Raunds Saxon, Raunds Windmill, Ringstead, Rural East, Rural North, Rural West, Shire Lodge, Stanwick, Thrapston, West, Woodford.

Daventry: Abbey North, Abbey South, Badby, Barby and Kilsby, Boughton and Pitsford, Brampton, Braunston, Brixworth, Byfield, Clipston, Cote, Crick, Downs, Drayton, Earls Barton, Flore, Grange, Harpole, Heyford, Hill, Long Buckby, Moulton, Ravensthorpe, Spratton, Walgrave, Weedon, Welford, West, West Haddon and Guilsborough, Woodford, Yelvertoft.

Kettering: All Saints, Avondale, Barton, Brambleside, Buccleuch, Latimer, Loatland, Millbrook, Pipers Hill, Plessy, Queen Eleanor, St Andrew's, St Giles, St Mary's, St Michael's, St Peter's, Slade, Spinney, Tresham, Trinity, Warkton, Welland, Wicksteed.

Northampton North: Abington, Boughton Green, Eastfield, Headlands, Kingsley, Kingsthorpe, Lumbertubs, Parklands, St David, Thorplands.

Northampton South: Billing, Castle, Delapre, Ecton Brook, New Duston, Old Duston, St Crispin, St James, Spencer, Weston.

South Northamptonshire: Astwell, Blakesley, Blisworth, Brackley East, Brackley South, Brackley West, Chase, Cogenhoe, Cosgrove, Courteenhall, Deanshanger, East Hunsbury, Grafton, Kings Sutton, Kingthorn, Little Brook, Middleton Cheney, Nene Valley, Salcey, Silverstone, Steane, Tove, Towcester Brook, Towcester Mill, Wardoun, Washington, West Hunsbury, Whittlewood, Yardley.

Wellingborough: Brickhill, Castle, Croyland, Finedon, Great Doddington and Wilby, Hemmingwell, Higham Ferrers, Irchester, North, Queensway, Redwell East, Redwell West, Rushden East, Rushden North, Rushden South, Rushden West, South, Swanspool, Wollaston.

North Somerset
North Somerset: Backwell, Clevedon Central, Clevedon East, Clevedon North, Clevedon South, Clevedon Walton, Clevedon West, Clevedon Yeo, Easton-in-Gordano, Gordano, Nailsea East, Nailsea North and West, Pill, Portishead Central, Portishead Coast, Portishead East, Portishead Redcliffe Bay, Portishead South and North Weston, Portishead West, Winford, Wraxall and Long Ashton, Wrington, Yatton.

Weston-Super-Mare: Banwell and Winscombe, Blagdon and Churchill, Congresbury, Hutton and Locking, Kewstoke, Weston-Super-Mare Central, Weston-Super-Mare Clarence and Uphill, Weston-Super-Mare East, Weston-Super-Mare Milton and Old Worle, Weston-Super-Mare North Worle, Weston-Super-Mare South, Weston-Super-Mare South Worle, Weston-Super-Mare West.

See: Bath and North East Somerset for Bath & North East Somerset constituencies and Somerset for Bridgwater and West Somerset, Somerton and Frome, Taunton Deane, Wells & Yeovil constituencies.

Northumberland
Berwick-upon-Tweed: Alnmouth and Lesbury, Alnwick Castle, Alnwick Clayport, Alnwick Hotspur, Amble Central, Amble East, Amble West, Bamburgh, Beadnell, Belford, Castle, Chevington, Cheviot, Ellington, Embleton, Flodden, Ford, Grove, Harbottle and Elsdon, Hartburn, Hedgeley, Islandshire, Longframlington, Longhorsley, Longhoughton with Craster and Rennington, Lower Spittal, Lowick, Lynemouth, Magdalene, Norhamshire, North Sunderland, Prior, Rothbury and South Rural, Shilbottle, St Boisil, Stadium, Ulgham, Upper Spittal, Warkworth, Whittingham, Wooler.

Blyth Valley: Cowpen, Cramlington East, Cramlington Eastfield with East Hartford, Cramlington North, Cramlington Parkside, Cramlington South East, Cramlington Village, Cramlington West, Croft, Hartley, Holywell, Isabella, Kitty Brewster, Newsham and New Delaval, Plessey, Seaton Delaval, Seghill, South Beach, South Newsham, Wensleydale.

Hexham: Acomb, Allendale, Bellingham, Broomhaugh and Riding, Chollerton with Whittington, Corbridge, East Tynedale, Hadrian, Haltwhistle, Haydon, Heddon-on-the-Wall, Hexham Gilesgate, Hexham Hencotes, Hexham Leazes, Hexham Priestpopple, Humshaugh and Wall, Ovingham, Ponteland East, Ponteland North, Ponteland South, Ponteland West, Prudhoe Castle, Prudhoe North, Prudhoe South, Prudhoe West, Redesdale, Sandhoe with Dilston, Slaley and Hexhamshire, South Tynedale, Stamfordham, Stannington, Stocksfield with Mickley, Upper North Tyne, Wanney, Warden and Newbrough, Wark, West Tynedale, Wylam.

Wansbeck: Bedlington Central, Bedlington East, Bedlington West, Bothal, Central, Choppington, college, Guide Post, Haydon, Hebron, Hepscott and Mitford, Hirst, Morpeth Central, Morpeth Kirkhill, Morpeth North, Morpeth South, Morpeth Stobhill, Newbiggin East, Newbiggin West, Park, Pegswood, Seaton, Sleekburn, Stakeford.

North Yorkshire
Harrogate and Knaresborough: Bilton, Boroughbridge, Claro, Granby, Harlow Moor, High Harrogate, Hookstone, Killinghall, Knaresborough East, Knaresborough King James, Knaresborough Scriven Park, Low Harrogate, New Park, Pannal, Rossett, Saltergate, Starbeck, Stray, Woodfield.

Richmond: Addlebrough, Barton, Bedale, Bolton Castle, Brompton, Brompton-on-Swale and Scorton, Broughton and Greenhow, Catterick, Colburn, Cowtons, Crakehall, Croft, Great Ayton, Gilling West, Hawes and High Abbotside, Hipswell, Hornby Castle, Leeming, Leeming Bar, Leyburn, Lower Wensleydale, Melsonby, Middleham, Middleton Tyas, Morton-on-Swale, Newsham with Eppleby, Northallerton Broomfield, Northallerton Central, Northallerton North, Osmotherley, Penhill, Reeth and Arkengarthdale, Richmond Central, Richmond East, Richmond West, Romanby, Rudby, Scotton, Stokesley, Swaledale, Swainby, Tanfield.

Scarborough and Whitby: Castle, Cayton, Central, Danby, Derwent Valley, Eastfield, Esk Valley, Falsgrave Park, Fylingdales, Lindhead, Mayfield, Mulgrave, Newby, North Bay, Northstead, Ramshill, Scalby, Hackness and Staintondale, Seamer, Stepney, Streonshalh, Weaponness, Whitby West Cliff, Woodlands.

Selby and Ainsty: Appleton Roebuck, Barlby, Brayton, Camblesforth, Cawood with Wistow, Eggborough, Fairburn with Brotherton, Hambleton, Hemingbrough, Marston Moor, Monk Fryston and South Milford, North Duffield, Ouseburn, Ribston, Riccall with Escrick, Saxton and Ulleskelf, Selby North, Selby South, Selby West, Sherburn in Elmet, Spofforth with Lower Wharfedale, Tadcaster East, Tadcaster West, Whitley.

Skipton and Ripon: Aire Valley with Lothersdale, Barden Fell, Bentham, Bishop Monkton, Cowling, Embsay-with-Eastby, Gargrave and Malhamdale, Glusburn, Grassington, Hellifield and Long Preston, Ingleton and Clapham, Kirkby Malzeard, Lower Nidderdale, Mashamshire, Newby, Nidd Valley, Pateley Bridge, Penyghent, Ripon Minster, Ripon Moorside, Ripon Spa, Settle and Ribblebanks, Skipton East, Skipton North, Skipton South, Skipton West, Sutton-in-Craven, Upper Wharfedale, Washburn, Wathvale, West Craven.

Thirsk and Malton: Amotherby, Ampleforth, Cropton, Dales, Derwent, Easingwold, Filey, Helmsley, Helperby, Hertford, Hovingham, Huby and Sutton, Kirkbymoorside, Malton, Norton East, Norton West, Pickering East, Pickering West, Rillington, Ryedale South West, Sherburn, Sheriff Hutton, Shipton, Sinnington, Sowerby, Stillington, Thirsk, Thornton Dale, Thorntons, Tollerton, Topcliffe, White Horse, Whitestonecliffe, Wolds.

See: Middlesbrough and Redcar and Cleveland for Middlesbrough, Middlesbrough South and East Cleveland & Redcar constituencies and York for York Central & Outer constituencies.

Nottingham
Nottingham East: Arboretum, Berridge, Dales, Mapperley, St Ann's, Sherwood.

Nottingham North: Aspley, Basford, Bestwood, Bilborough, Bulwell, Bulwell Forest.

Nottingham South: Bridge, Clifton North, Clifton South, Dunkirk and Lenton, Leen Valley, Radford and Park, Wollaton East and Lenton Abbey, Wollaton West.

See: Nottinghamshire for Ashfield, Bassetlaw, Broxtowe, Gedling, Mansfield, Newark, Rushcliffe & Sherwood constituencies.

Nottinghamshire
Ashfield: Brinsley, Eastwood North and Greasley (Beauvale), Eastwood South, Jacksdale, Kirkby in Ashfield Central, Kirkby in Ashfield East, Kirkby in Ashfield West, Selston, Sutton in Ashfield Central, Sutton in Ashfield East, Sutton in Ashfield North, Sutton in Ashfield West, Underwood, Woodhouse.

Bassetlaw: Beckingham, Blyth, Carlton, Clayworth, East Retford East, East Retford North, East Retford South, East Retford West, Everton, Harworth, Langold, Misterton, Ranskill, Sturton, Sutton, Welbeck, Worksop East, Worksop North, Worksop North East, Worksop North West, Worksop South, Worksop South East.

Broxtowe: Attenborough, Awsworth, Beeston Central, Beeston North, Beeston Rylands, Beeston West, Bramcote, Chilwell East, Chilwell West, Cossall and Kimberley, Greasley (Giltbrook and Newthorpe), Nuthall East and Strelley, Nuthall West and Greasley (Watnall), Stapleford North, Stapleford South East, Stapleford South West, Toton and Chilwell Meadows, Trowell.

Gedling: Bonington, Burton Joyce and Stoke Bardolph, Carlton, Carlton Hill, Daybrook, Gedling, Killisick, Kingswell, Mapperley Plains, Netherfield and Colwick, Phoenix, Porchester, St James, St Marys, Valley, Woodthorpe.

Mansfield: Berry Hill, Birklands, Broomhill, Cumberlands, Eakring, Forest Town East, Forest Town West, Grange Farm, Ladybrook, Leeming, Lindhurst, Meden, Oak Tree, Pleasley Hill, Portland, Priory, Ravensdale, Robin Hood, Sherwood.

Newark: Balderton North, Balderton West, Beacon, Bingham East, Bingham West, Bridge, Castle, Caunton, Collingham and Meering, Cranmer, Devon, East Markham, Farndon, Lowdham, Magnus, Muskham, Oak, Rampton, Southwell East, Southwell North, Southwell West, Sutton-on-Trent, Thoroton, Trent, Tuxford, Winthorpe.

Rushcliffe: Abbey, Compton Acres, Cotgrave, Edwalton Village, Gamston, Gotham, Keyworth North, Keyworth South, Lady Bay, Leake, Lutterell, Manvers, Melton, Musters, Nevile, Ruddington, Soar Valley, Stanford, Tollerton, Trent, Trent Bridge, Wiverton,
Wolds.

Sherwood: Bestwood Village, Bilsthorpe, Blidworth, Boughton, Calverton, Clipstone, Edwinstowe, Farnsfield, Lambley, Newstead, Ollerton, Rainworth, Ravenshead, Woodborough.

See: Nottingham for Nottingham East, North & South constituencies.

Oxfordshire
Banbury: Adderbury, Ambrosden and Chesterton, Banbury Calthorpe, Banbury Easington, Banbury Grimsbury and Castle, Banbury Hardwick, Banbury Neithrop, Banbury Ruscote, Bicester East, Bicester North, Bicester South, Bicester Town, Bicester West,
Bloxham and Bodicote, Caversfield, Cropredy, Deddington, Fringford, Hook Norton, Launton, Sibford, The Astons and Heyfords, Wroxton.

Henley: Aston Rowant, Benson, Berinsfield, Chalgrove, Chiltern Woods, Chinnor, Crowmarsh, Forest Hill and Holton, Garsington, Goring, Great Milton, Henley North, Henley South, Kirtlington, Otmoor, Sandford, Shiplake, Sonning Common, Thame North, Thame South, Watlington, Wheatley, Woodcote.

Oxford East: Barton and Sandhills, Blackbird Leys, Carfax, Churchill, Cowley, Cowley Marsh, Headington, Headington Hill and Northway, Hinksey Park, Holywell, Iffley Fields, Littlemore, Lye Valley, Marston, Northfield Brook, Quarry and Risinghurst, Rose Hill and Iffley, St Clement's, St Mary's.

Oxford West and Abingdon: Abingdon Abbey and Barton, Abingdon Caldecott, Abingdon Dunmore, Abingdon Fitzharris, Abingdon Northcourt, Abingdon Ock Meadow, Abingdon Peachcroft, Appleton and Cumnor, Jericho and Osney, Kennington and South Hinksey, Kidlington North, Kidlington South, North, North Hinksey and Wytham, Radley, St Margaret's, Summertown, Sunningwell and Wootton, Wolvercote, Yarnton, Gosford and Water Eaton.

Wantage: Blewbury and Upton, Brightwell, Cholsey and Wallingford South, Craven,  Didcot All Saints, Didcot Ladygrove, Didcot Northbourne, Didcot Park, Drayton, Faringdon and The Coxwells, Greendown, Grove, Hagbourne, Hanneys, Harwell, Hendreds, Kingston Bagpuize with Southmoor, Longworth, Marcham and Shippon, Shrivenham, Stanford, Sutton Courtenay and Appleford, Wallingford North, Wantage Charlton, Wantage Segsbury.

Witney: Alvescot and Filkins, Ascott and Shipton, Bampton and Clanfield, Brize Norton and Shilton, Burford, Carterton North East, Carterton North West, Carterton South, Chadlington and Churchill, Charlbury and Finstock, Chipping Norton, Ducklington, Eynsham and Cassington, Freeland and Hanborough, Hailey, Minster Lovell and Leafield, Kingham, Rollright and Enstone, Milton-under-Wychwood, North Leigh, Standlake, Aston and Stanton Harcourt, Stonesfield and Tackley, The Bartons, Witney Central, Witney East, Witney North, Witney South, Witney West, Woodstock and Bladon.

Portsmouth
Portsmouth North: Baffins, Copnor, Cosham, Drayton and Farlington, Hilsea, Nelson, Paulsgrove.

Portsmouth South: Central Southsea, Charles Dickens, Eastney and Craneswater, Fratton, Milton, St Jude, St Thomas.

See: Hampshire and Southampton for Aldershot, Basingstoke, East Hampshire, Eastleigh, Fareham, Gosport, Havant, Meon Valley, New Forest East, New Forest West, North East Hampshire, North West Hampshire, Romsey and Southampton North, Southampton Itchen, Southampton Test & Winchester constituencies.

Shropshire and Telford and Wrekin
Ludlow: Apedale, Alveley, Bishop's Castle with Onny Valley, Bitterley with Stoke St Milborough, Bridgnorth Castle, Bridgnorth East, Bridgnorth Morfe, Bridgnorth West, Broseley East, Broseley West, Bucknell, Burford, Caynham with Ashford, Chirbury, Church Stretton North, Church Stretton South, Claverley, Clee, Cleobury Mortimer, Clun, Clun Forest, Corve Valley, Ditton Priors, Glazeley, Harrington, Highley, Kemp Valley, Ludlow Henley, Ludlow St Laurence's, Ludlow St Peter's, Ludlow Sheet with Ludford, Morville, Much Wenlock, Stokesay, Stottesdon, Upper Corvedale, Wistanstow with Hopesay, Worfield, Worthen.

North Shropshire: Baschurch, Cabin Lane, Cambrian, Carreg Llwyd, Castle, Clive and Myddle, Cockshutt, Dudleston Heath, Ellesmere and Welshampton, Gatacre, Gobowen, Hinstock, Hodnet, Hordley, Tetchill and Lyneal, Kinnerley, Llanyblodwel and Pant, Market Drayton East, Market Drayton North, Market Drayton South, Maserfield, Prees, Ruyton and West Felton, Shavington, Shawbury, St Martin's, Sutton, Sweeney and Trefonen, Wem East, Wem Rural, Wem West, Weston Rhyn, Whitchurch North, Whitchurch Rural, Whitchurch South, Whitchurch West, Whittington, Whixhall, Woore.

Shrewsbury and Atcham: Bagley, Battlefield and Heathgates, Bayston Hill, Belle Vue, Bowbrook, Castlefields and Quarry, Column, Condover,
Copthorne, Hanwood and Longden, Harlescott, Haughmond and Attingham, Lawley, Meole Brace, Monkmoor, Montford, Pimhill, Porthill, Rea Valley, Rowton, Severn Valley, Sundorne, Sutton and Reabrook, Underdale.

Telford: Brookside, Cuckoo Oak, Dawley Magna, Horsehay and Lightmoor, Ironbridge Gorge, Ketley and Oakengates, Lawley and Overdale, Madeley, Malinslee, Priorslee, St Georges, The Nedge, Woodside, Wrockwardine Wood and Trench.

The Wrekin: Albrighton South, Apley Castle, Arleston, Church Aston and Lilleshall, college, Donington and Albrighton North, Donnington, Dothill, Edgmond, Ercall, Ercall Magna, Hadley and Leegomery, Haygate, Muxton, Newport East, Newport North, Newport South, Newport West, Park, Shawbirch, Shifnal Idsall, Shifnal Manor, Shifnal Rural, Wrockwardine.

Somerset
Bridgwater and West Somerset: Alcombe East, Alcombe West, Aville Vale, Bridgwater Bower, Bridgwater Eastover, Bridgwater Hamp, Bridgwater Quantock, Bridgwater Sydenham, Bridgwater Victoria, Brompton Ralph and Haddon, Cannington and Quantocks, Carhampton and Withycombe, Crowcombe and Stogumber, Dulverton and Brushford, Dunster, East Poldens, Exmoor, Huntspill and Pawlett, King's Isle, Minehead North, Minehead South, North Petherton, Old Cleeve, Porlock and District, Puriton, Quantock Vale, Quarme, Sandford, Watchet, West Poldens, West Quantock, Williton, Woolavington.

Somerton and Frome: Beacon, Beckington and Rode, Blackmoor Vale, Bruton, Burrow Hill, Camelot, Cary, Coleford, Creech, Curry Rivel, Frome Berkley Down, Frome Fromefield, Frome Keyford, Frome Park, Frome Welshmill, Islemoor, Langport and Huish, Martock, Mells, Milborne Port, Nordinton, Northstone, Postlebury, Stratton, Tower, Turn Hill, Vale, Wessex, Wincanton.

Taunton Deane: Bishop's Hull, Bishop's Lydeard, Blackdown, Bradford-on-Tone, Comeytrowe, Milverton and North Deane, Monument, Neroche, North Curry, Norton Fitzwarren, Ruishton and Creech, Staplegrove, Stoke St. Gregory, Taunton Blackbrook and Holway, Taunton Eastgate, Taunton Fairwater, Taunton Halcon, Taunton Killams and Mountfield, Taunton Lyngford, Taunton Manor and Wilton, Taunton Pyrland and Rowbarton, Trull, Wellington East, Wellington North, Wellington Rockwell Green and West, West Monkton, Wiveliscombe and West Deane.

Wells: Ashwick and Ston Easton, Avalon, Axbridge, Axe Vale, Berrow, Brent North, Burnham North, Burnham South, Cheddar and Shipham, Chilcompton, Glastonbury St Benedict's, Glastonbury St Edmund's, Glastonbury St John's, Glastonbury St Mary's, Highbridge, Knoll, Knowle, Moor, Nedge, Pylcombe, Rodney and Priddy, St Cuthbert (Out) North and West, Shepton East, Shepton West, Street North, Street South, Street West, Wedmore and Mark, Wells Central, Wells St Cuthbert's, Wells St Thomas’.

Yeovil: Blackdown, Brympton, Chard Avishayes, Chard Combe, Chard Crimchard, Chard Holyrood, Chard Jocelyn, Coker, Crewkerne, Eggwood, Hamdon, Ilminster, Ivelchester, Neroche, Parrett, St Michael's, South Petherton, Tatworth and Forton, Windwhistle, Yeovil Central, Yeovil East, Yeovil South, Yeovil West, Yeovil Without.

See: Bath and North East Somerset for Bath & North East Somerset constituencies and North Somerset for North Somerset & Weston-Super-Mare constituencies.

South Gloucestershire
Filton and Bradley Stoke: Almondsbury, Bradley Stoke Baileys Court, Bradley Stoke Bowsland, Bradley Stoke Sherbourne, Downend, Filton, Patchway, Pilning and Severn Beach, Staple Hill, Stoke Gifford, Winterbourne.

Kingswood: Bitton, Hanham, Kings Chase, Longwell Green, Oldland Common, Parkwall, Rodway, Siston, Woodstock.

Thornbury and Yate: Alveston, Boyd Valley, Charfield, Chipping Sodbury, Cotswold Edge, Dodington, Frampton Cotterell, Ladden Brook, Severn, Thornbury North, Thornbury South, Westerleigh, Yate Central, Yate North, Yate West.

See: Gloucestershire for Cheltenham, Forest of Dean, Gloucester, Stroud, Tewkesbury & The Cotswolds constituencies.

Staffordshire
Burton: Abbey, Anglesey, Branston, Brizlincote, Burton, Churnet, Crown, Eton Park, Heath, Horninglow, Rolleston on Dove, Shobnall, Stapenhill, Stretton, Town, Tutbury and Outwoods, Weaver, Winshill.

Cannock Chase: Brereton and Ravenhill, Cannock East, Cannock North, Cannock South, Cannock West, Etching Hill and The Heath, Hagley, Hawks Green, Heath Hayes East and Wimblebury, Hednesford Green Heath, Hednesford North, Hednesford South, Norton Canes, Rawnsley, Western Springs.

Lichfield: All Saints, Alrewas and Fradley, Armitage with Handsacre, Bagots, Boley Park, Boney Hay, Burntwood Central, Chadsmead, Chase Terrace, Chasetown, Colton and Mavesyn Ridware, Curborough, Hammerwich, Highfield, King's Bromley, Leomansley, Longdon, Needwood, St John's, Stowe, Summerfield, Whittington, Yoxall.

Newcastle-under-Lyme: Audley and Bignall End, Bradwell, Chesterton, Clayton, Cross Heath, Halmerend, Holditch, Keele, Knutton and Silverdale, May Bank, Porthill, Seabridge, Silverdale and Parksite, Thistleberry, Town, Westlands, Wolstanton.

South Staffordshire: Bilbrook, Brewood and Coven, Cheslyn Hay North and Saredon, Cheslyn Hay South, Codsall North, Codsall South, Essington,
Featherstone and Shareshill, Great Wyrley Landywood, Great Wyrley Town, Himley and Swindon, Huntington and Hatherton, Kinver, Pattingham and Patshull, Perton Dippons, Perton East, Perton Lakeside, Trysull and Seisdon, Wombourne North and Lower Penn, Wombourne South East, Wombourne South West.

Stafford: Baswich, Common, Coton, Forebridge, Haywood and Hixon, Highfields and Western Downs, Holmcroft, Littleworth, Manor, Milford, Penkridge North East and Acton Trussell, Penkridge South East, Penkridge West, Penkside, Rowley, Seighford, Tillington, Weeping Cross, Wheaton Aston, Bishopswood and Lapley.

Staffordshire Moorlands: Alton, Bagnall and Stanley, Biddulph East, Biddulph Moor, Biddulph North, Biddulph South, Biddulph West, Brown Edge and Endon, Caverswall, Cellarhead, Cheddleton, Churnet, Dane, Hamps Valley, Horton, Ipstones, Leek East, Leek North, Leek South, Leek West, Manifold, Werrington.

Stone: Barlaston and Oulton, Chartley, Cheadle North East, Cheadle South East, Cheadle West, Checkley, Church Eaton, Eccleshall, Forsbrook, Fulford, Gnosall and Woodseaves, Loggerheads and Whitmore, Madeley, Milwich, St Michael's, Stonefield and Christchurch, Swynnerton, Walton.

Tamworth: Amington, Belgrave, Bolehall, Bourne Vale, Castle, Fazeley, Glascote, Little Aston, Mease and Tame, Mercian, Shenstone, Spital, Stonnall, Stonydelph, Trinity, Wilnecote.

See: Stoke-on-Trent for Stoke-on-Trent Central, North & South constituencies.

Stockton-on-Tees
Stockton North: Billingham Central, Billingham East, Billingham North, Billingham South, Billingham West, Hardwick, Newtown, Northern Parishes, Norton North, Norton South, Norton West, Roseworth, Stockton Town Centre, Western Parishes.

Stockton South: Bishopsgarth and Elm Tree, Eaglescliffe, Fairfield, Grangefield, Hartburn, Ingleby Barwick East, Ingleby Barwick West, Mandale and Victoria, Parkfield and Oxbridge, Stainsby Hill, Village, Yarm.

See: Durham and Darlington for Bishop Auckland, City of Durham, Darlington, Easington, North Durham, North West Durham & Sedgefield constituencies.

Stoke-on-Trent
Stoke-on-Trent Central: Abbey Green, Bentilee and Townsend, Berryhill and Hanley East, Hanley West and Shelton, Hartshill and Penkhull, Northwood and Birches Head, Stoke and Trent Vale.

Stoke-on-Trent North: Burslem North, Burslem South, Butt Lane, Chell and Packmoor, East Valley, Kidsgrove, Norton and Bradeley, Ravenscliffe, Talke, Tunstall.

Stoke-on-Trent South: Blurton, Fenton, Longton North, Longton South, Meir Park and Sandon, Trentham and Hanford, Weston and Meir North.

See: Staffordshire for Burton, Cannock Chase, Lichfield, Newcastle-under-Lyme, South Staffordshire, Stafford, Staffordshire Moorlands, Stone & Tamworth constituencies.

Suffolk
Bury St Edmunds: Abbeygate, Bacton and Old Newton, Badwell Ash, Eastgate, Elmswell and Norton, Fornham, Gislingham, Great Barton, Haughley and Wetherden, Horringer and Whelnetham, Minden, Moreton Hall, Needham Market, Northgate, Onehouse, Pakenham, Rattlesden, Rickinghall and Walsham, Ringshall, Risbygate, Rougham, St Olaves, Southgate, Stowmarket Central, Stowmarket North, Stowmarket South, Stowupland, Thurston and Hessett, Westgate, Woolpit.

Central Suffolk and North Ipswich: Barking and Somersham, Bramford and Blakenham, Castle Hill, Claydon and Barham, Debenham, Earl Soham, Eye, Framlingham, Fressingfield, Grundisburgh, Hacheston, Helmingham and Coddenham, Hoxne, Kesgrave East, Kesgrave West, Mendlesham, Otley, Palgrave, Rushmere St Andrew, Stradbroke and Laxfield, The Stonhams, Wetheringsett, Whitehouse, Whitton, Wickham Market, Witnesham, Worlingworth.

Ipswich: Alexandra, Bixley, Bridge, Gainsborough, Gipping, Holywells Ward, Priory Heath, Rushmere, St John's, St Margaret's, Sprites, Stoke Park, Westgate.

South Suffolk: Alton, Berners, Boxford, Brett Vale, Brook, Bures St Mary, Cavendish, Chadacre, Clare, Dodnash, Glemsford and Stanstead, Great Cornard North, Great Cornard South, Hadleigh North, Hadleigh South, Holbrook, Lavenham, Leavenheath, Long Melford, Lower Brett, Mid Samford, Nayland, North Cosford, Pinewood, South Cosford, Sudbury East, Sudbury North, Sudbury South, Waldingfield.

Suffolk Coastal: Aldeburgh, Blything, Farlingaye, Felixstowe East, Felixstowe North, Felixstowe South, Felixstowe South East, Felixstowe West, Halesworth, Hollesley with Eyke, Kyson, Leiston, Martlesham, Melton and Ufford, Nacton, Orford and Tunstall, Peasenhall, Rendlesham, Riverside, Saxmundham, Seckford, Snape, Southwold and Reydon, Sutton, Trimleys with Kirton, Walberswick and Wenhaston, Wrentham, Yoxford.

Waveney: Beccles North, Beccles South, Bungay, Carlton, Carlton Colville, Gunton and Corton, Harbour, Kessingland, Kirkley, Lothingland, Normanston, Oulton, Oulton Broad, Pakefield, St Margaret's, The Saints, Wainford, Whitton, Worlingham.

West Suffolk: All Saints, Bardwell, Barningham, Barrow, Brandon East, Brandon West, Chedburgh, Eriswell and The Rows, Exning, Great Heath, Haverhill East, Haverhill North, Haverhill South, Haverhill West, Hundon, Iceni, Ixworth, Kedington, Lakenheath, Manor, Market, Red Lodge, Risby, St Mary's, Severals, South, Stanton, Wickhambrook, Withersfield.

Surrey
East Surrey: Bletchingley and Nutfield, Burstow, Horne and Outwood, Chaldon, Dormansland and Felcourt, Felbridge, Godstone, Harestone, Horley Central, Horley East, Horley West, Limpsfield, Lingfield and Crowhurst, Oxted North and Tandridge, Oxted South, Portley, Queens Park, Tatsfield and Titsey, Valley, Warlingham East and Chelsham and Farleigh, Warlingham West, Westway, Whyteleafe, Woldingham.

Epsom and Ewell: Ashtead Common, Ashtead Park, Ashtead Village, Auriol, college, Court, Cuddington, Ewell, Ewell Court, Nonsuch, Nork, Ruxley, Stamford, Stoneleigh, Tattenhams, Town, West Ewell, Woodcote.

Esher and Walton: Claygate, Cobham and Downside, Cobham Fairmile, Esher, Hersham North, Hersham South, Hinchley Wood, Long Ditton, Molesey East, Molesey North, Molesey South, Oxshott and Stoke D’Abernon, Thames Ditton, Walton Ambleside, Walton Central, Walton North, Walton South, Weston Green.

Guildford: Alfold, Cranleigh Rural and Ellens Green, Burpham, Blackheath and Wonersh, Christchurch, Cranleigh East, Cranleigh West, Ewhurst, Friary and St Nicolas, Holy Trinity, Merrow, Onslow, Pilgrims, Shalford, Shamley Green and Cranleigh North, Stoke, Stoughton, Westborough, Worplesdon.

Mole Valley: Beare Green, Bookham North, Bookham South, Box Hill and Headley, Brockham, Betchworth and Buckland, Capel, Leigh and Newdigate, Charlwood, Clandon and Horsley, Dorking North, Dorking South, Effingham, Fetcham East, Fetcham West, Holmwoods, Leatherhead North, Leatherhead South, Leith Hill, Lovelace, Mickleham, Westhumble and Pixham, Okewood, Send, Tillingbourne, Westcott.

Reigate: Banstead Village, Chipstead, Hooley and Woodmansterne, Earlswood and Whitebushes, Kingswood with Burgh Heath, Meadvale and St John's, Merstham, Preston, Redhill East, Redhill West, Reigate Central, Reigate Hill, Salfords and Sidlow, South Park and Woodhatch, Tadworth and Walton.

Runnymede and Weybridge: Addlestone Bourneside, Addlestone North, Chertsey Meads, Chertsey St Ann's, Chertsey South and Row Town, Egham Hythe, Egham Town, Englefield Green East, Englefield Green West, Foxhills, New Haw, Oatlands Park, St George's Hill, Thorpe, Virginia Water, Weybridge North, Weybridge South, Woodham.

South West Surrey: Bramley, Busbridge and Hascombe, Chiddingfold and Dunsfold, Elstead and Thursley, Farnham Bourne, Farnham Castle, Farnham Firgrove, Farnham Hale and Heath End, Farnham Moor Park, Farnham Shortheath and Boundstone, Farnham Upper Hale, Farnham Weybourne and Badshot Lea, Farnham Wrecclesham and Rowledge, Frensham, Dockenfield and Tilford, Godalming Binscombe, Godalming Central and Ockford, Godalming Charterhouse, Godalming Farncombe and Catteshall, Godalming Holloway, Haslemere Critchmere and Shottermill, Haslemere East and Grayswood, Hindhead, Milford, Witley and Hambledon.

Spelthorne: Ashford Common, Ashford East, Ashford North and Stanwell South, Ashford Town, Halliford and Sunbury West, Laleham and Shepperton Green, Riverside and Laleham, Shepperton Town, Staines, Staines South, Stanwell North, Sunbury Common, Sunbury East.

Surrey Heath: Ash South and Tongham, Ash Vale, Ash Wharf, Bagshot, Bisley, Chobham, Frimley, Frimley Green, Heatherside, Lightwater, Mytchett And Deepcut, Old Dean, Parkside, St Michaels, St Pauls, Town, Watchetts, West End, Windlesham.

Woking: Brookwood, Byfleet, Goldsworth East, Goldsworth West,
Hermitage and Knaphill South, Horsell East and Woodham, Horsell West, Kingfield and Westfield, Knaphill, Maybury and Sheerwater, Mayford and Sutton Green, Mount Hermon East, Mount Hermon West, Normandy, Old Woking, Pirbright, Pyrford, St John's and Hook Heath, West Byfleet.

Swindon
North Swindon: Blunsdon & Highworth, Covingham & Dorcan (3 Polling Districts), Gorse Hill & Pinehurst, Haydon Wick, Mannington & Western (2 Polling Districts), Penhill & Upper Stratton, Priory Vale, Rodbourne Cheney, St Andrews, St Margaret & South Marston.

South Swindon: Central, Chiseldon & Lawn, Covingham & Dorcan (1 Polling District), Eastcott, Liden Eldene & Park South, Lydiard & Freshbrook, Mannington & Western (2 Polling Districts), Old Town, Ridgeway, Shaw, Walcot & Park North, Wroughton & Wichelstowe.

See: Wiltshire for Chippenham, Devizes, North Wiltshire, Salisbury & South West Wiltshire constituencies.

Warrington
Warrington North: Birchwood, Burtonwood and Winwick, Culcheth, Glazebury and Croft, Fairfield and Howley, Orford, Poplars and Hulme, Poulton North, Poulton South, Rixton and Woolston, Westbrook.

Warrington South: Appleton, Bewsey and Whitecross, Chapelford and Old Hall, Grappenhall, Great Sankey North and Whittle Hall, Great Sankey South, Latchford East, Latchford West, Lymm North and Thelwall, Lymm South, Penketh and Cuerdley, Stockton Heath.

See: Cheshire for City of Chester, Congleton, Crewe and Nantwich, Eddisbury, Ellesmere Port and Neston, Halton, Macclesfield, Tatton & Weaver Vale constituencies.

Warwickshire

Kenilworth and Southam: Abbey, Burton Dassett, Cubbington, Dunchurch and Knightlow, Fenny Compton, Harbury, Kineton, Lapworth, Leam Valley, Leek Wootton, Long Itchington, Park Hill, Radford Semele, Southam, St John's, Stockton and Napton, Stoneleigh, Wellesbourne.

North Warwickshire: Atherstone Central, Atherstone North, Atherstone South and Mancetter, Baddesley and Grendon, Bede, Coleshill North, Coleshill South, Curdworth, Dordon, Exhall, Fillongley, Heath, Hurley and Wood End, Kingsbury, Newton Regis and Warton, Polesworth East, Polesworth West, Poplar, Slough, Water Orton.

Nuneaton: Abbey, Arbury, Arley and Whitacre, Attleborough, Bar Pool, Camp Hill, Galley Common, Hartshill, Kingswood, St Nicolas, Weddington, Wem Brook, Whitestone.

Rugby: Admirals, Avon and Swift, Benn, Bilton, Brownsover North, Brownsover South, Bulkington, Caldecott, Earl Craven and Wolston, Eastlands, Fosse, Hillmorton, Lawford and King's Newnham, New Bilton, Newbold, Overslade, Paddox, Wolvey.

Stratford-on-Avon: Alcester, Aston Cantlow, Bardon, Bidford and Salford, Brailes, Claverdon, Ettington, Henley, Kinwarton, Long Compton, Quinton, Sambourne, Shipston, Snitterfield, Stratford Alveston, Stratford Avenue and New Town, Stratford Guild and Hathaway, Stratford Mount Pleasant, Studley, Tanworth, Tredington, Vale of the Red Horse, Welford.

Warwick and Leamington: Bishop's Tachbrook, Brunswick, Budbrooke, Clarendon, Crown, Manor, Milverton, Warwick North, Warwick South,
Warwick West, Whitnash, Willes.

West Sussex
Arundel and South Downs: Angmering, Arundel, Barnham, Bramber, Upper Beeding and Woodmancote, Bury, Chanctonbury, Chantry, Cowfold, Shermanbury and West Grinstead, Findon, Hassocks, Henfield, Hurstpierpoint and Downs, Petworth, Pulborough and Coldwatham, Steyning, Walberton, Wisborough Green.

Bognor Regis and Littlehampton: Aldwick East, Aldwick West, Beach, Bersted, Brookfield, Felpham East, Felpham West, Ham, Hotham, Marine, Middleton-on-Sea, Orchard, Pagham and Rose Green, Pevensey, River, Wick with Toddington, Yapton.

Chichester: Bosham, Boxgrove, Chichester East, Chichester North, Chichester South, Chichester West, Donnington, Easebourne, East Wittering, Fernhurst, Fishbourne, Funtington, Harting, Lavant, Midhurst, North Mundham, Plaistow, Rogate, Selsey North, Selsey South, Sidlesham, Southbourne, Stedham, Tangmere, West Wittering, Westbourne.

Crawley: Bewbush, Broadfield North, Broadfield South, Furnace Green, Gossops Green, Ifield, Langley Green, Maidenbower, Northgate, Pound Hill North, Pound Hill South and Worth, Southgate, Three Bridges, Tilgate, West Green.

East Worthing and Shoreham: Broadwater, Buckingham, Churchill, Cokeham, Eastbrook, Gaisford, Hillside, Manor, Marine, Mash Barn, Peverel, Offington, Selden, St Mary's, St Nicolas, Southlands, Southwick Green, Widewater.

Horsham: Ardingly and Balcombe, Billingshurst and Shipley, Broadbridge Heath, Copthorne and Worth, Crawley Down and Turners Hill, Denne, Forest, Holbrook East, Holbrook West, Horsham Park, Itchingfield, Slinfold and Warnham, Nuthurst, Roffey North, Roffey South, Rudgwick, Rusper and Colgate, Southwater, Trafalgar.

Mid Sussex: Ashurst Wood, Bolney, Burgess Hill Dunstall, Burgess Hill Franklands, Burgess Hill Leylands, Burgess Hill Meeds, Burgess Hill St Andrews, Burgess Hill Victoria, Cuckfield, East Grinstead Ashplats, East Grinstead Baldwins, East Grinstead Herontye, East Grinstead Imberhorne, East Grinstead Town, Haywards Heath Ashenground, Haywards Heath Bentswood, Haywards Heath Franklands, Haywards Heath Heath, Haywards Heath Lucastes, High Weald, Lindfield.

Worthing West: Castle, Central, Durrington, East Preston with Kingston, Ferring, Goring, Heene, Marine, Northbrook, Rustington East, Rustington West, Salvington, Tarring.

Wiltshire
Chippenham: Atworth and Whitley, Bradford-on-Avon North, Bradford-on-Avon South, Cepen Park, Chippenham Allington, Chippenham Audley, Chippenham Avon, Chippenham Hill Rise, Chippenham London Road, Chippenham Monkton Park, Chippenham Park, Chippenham Pewsham, Chippenham Redland, Chippenham Westcroft/Queens, Corsham, Holt, Lacock with Neston and Gastard, Manor Vale, Melksham North, Melksham Spa, Melkshan Without, Melksham Woodrow, Paxcroft, Pickwick.

Devizes: Aldbourne, All Cannings, Bedwyn, Bishops Cannings,
Bromham and Rowde, Bulford, Burbage, Cheverell, Collingbourne, Devizes East, Devizes North, Devizes South, Durrington, Lavingtons, Ludgershall, Marlborough East, Marlborough West, Milton Lilbourne, Netheravon, Ogbourne, Pewsey, Pewsey Vale, Potterne, Ramsbury, Roundway, Seend, Shalbourne, Tidworth, Perham Down and Ludgershall South, Upavon, Urchfont, West Selkley.

North Wiltshire: Ashton Keynes and Minety, Box, Bremhill, Brinkworth and The Somerfords, Calne Abberd, Calne Chilvester, Calne Lickhill, Calne Marden, Calne Priestley, Calne Quemerford, Calne Without, Colerne, Cricklade, Hilmarton, Kington Langley, Kington St. Michael, Lyneham, Malmesbury, Nettleton, Purton, Royal Wootton Bassett East, Royal Wootton Bassett North, Royal Wootton Bassett South, St. Paul Malmesbury Without and Sherston, The Lydiards and Broad Town.

Salisbury: Alderbury and Whiteparish, Amesbury East, Amesbury West, Bemerton, Bishopdown, Chalke Valley, Downton and Redlynch, Ebble, Fisherton and Bemerton Village, Harnham East, Harnham West, Laverstock, Lower Wylye and Woodford Valley, St Edmund and Milford, St Mark and Stratford, St Martin and Milford, St Paul, Till Valley and Wylye, Upper Bourne, Idmiston and Winterbourne, Wilton, Winterslow.

South West Wiltshire: Dilton Marsh, Donhead, Ethandune, Fonthill and Nadder, Knoyle, Mid Wylye Valley, Shearwater, Southwick and Wingfield, Summerham, Tisbury and Fovant, Trowbridge Adcroft, Trowbridge College, Trowbridge Drynham, Trowbridge John of Gaunt, Trowbridge Park, Warminster East, Warminster West, Westbury Ham, Westbury Laverton, Western and Mere.

See: Swindon for Swindon North and South constituencies.

Worcestershire
Bromsgrove: Alvechurch South, Alvechurch Village, Barnt Green and Hopwood, Beacon, Catshill, Charford, Drakes Cross and Walkers Heath, Furlongs, Hagley, Hillside, Hollywood and Majors Green, Linthurst, Marlbrook, Norton, St Johns, Sidemoor, Slideslow, Stoke Heath, Stoke Prior, Tardebigge, Uffdown, Waseley, Whitford, Woodvale, Wythall South.

Mid Worcestershire: Badsey, Bengeworth, Bowbrook, Bretforton and Offenham, Broadway and Wickhamford, Dodderhill, Drakes Broughton, Droitwich Central, Droitwich East, Droitwich South East, Droitwich South West, Droitwich West, Evesham North, Evesham South, Fladbury, Great Hampton, Hartlebury, Harvington and Norton, Honeybourne and Pebworth, Little Hampton, Lovett and North Claines, Norton and Whittington, Ombersley, Pinvin, The Littletons, Upton Snodsbury.

Redditch: Abbey, Astwood Bank and Feckenham, Batchley, Central, Church Hill, Crabbs Cross, Greenlands, Headless Cross and Oakenshaw, Inkberrow, Lodge Park, Matchborough, West, Winyates.

West Worcestershire: Alfrick and Leigh, Baldwin, Bredon, Broadheath, Chase, Dyson Perrins, Eckington, Elmley Castle and Somerville, Hallow, Kempsey, Lindridge, Link, Longdon, Martley, Morton, Pershore, Pickersleigh, Powick, Priory, Ripple, South Bredon Hill, Teme Valley, Tenbury, Upton and Hanley, Wells, West, Woodbury.

York
York Central: Acomb, Clifton, Fishergate, Guildhall, Heworth, Holgate, Hull Road, Micklegate, Westfield.

York Outer: Bishopthorpe, Derwent, Dringhouses and Woodthorpe, Fulford, Haxby and Wigginton, Heslington, Heworth Without, Huntington and New Earswick, Osbaldwick, Rural West York, Skelton, Rawcliffe and Clifton Without, Strensall, Wheldrake.

See: North Yorkshire for Harrogate and Knaresborough, Richmond, Scarborough and Whitby, Selby and Ainsty, Skipton and Ripon  & Thirsk and Malton constituencies.

See also
List of electoral wards in Wales
Local Government in England
Politics of England

Sources
opsi.gov.uk

 
Wards